= Culture of Guadalajara =

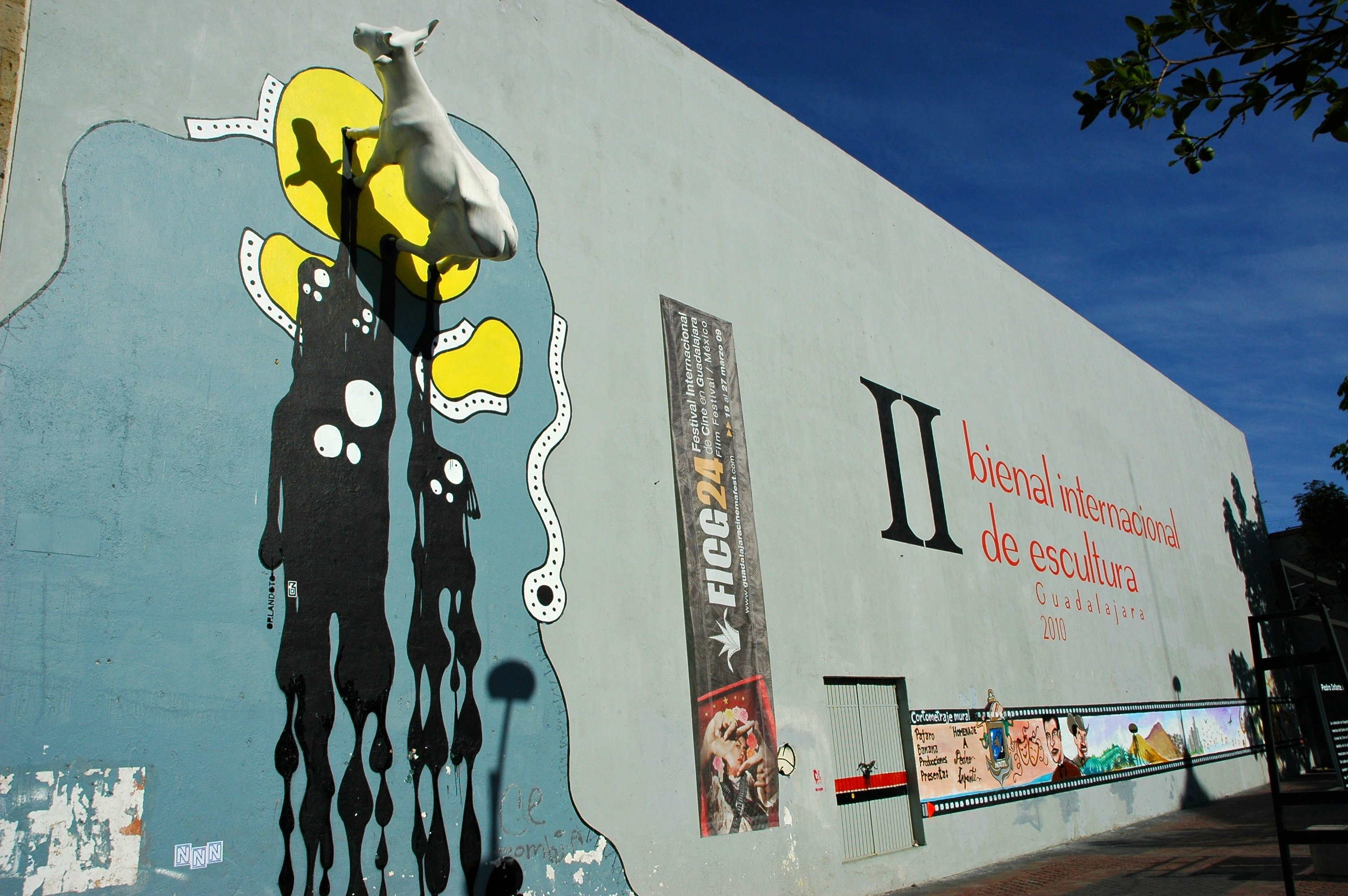
Sculpture close to the University of Guadalajara building

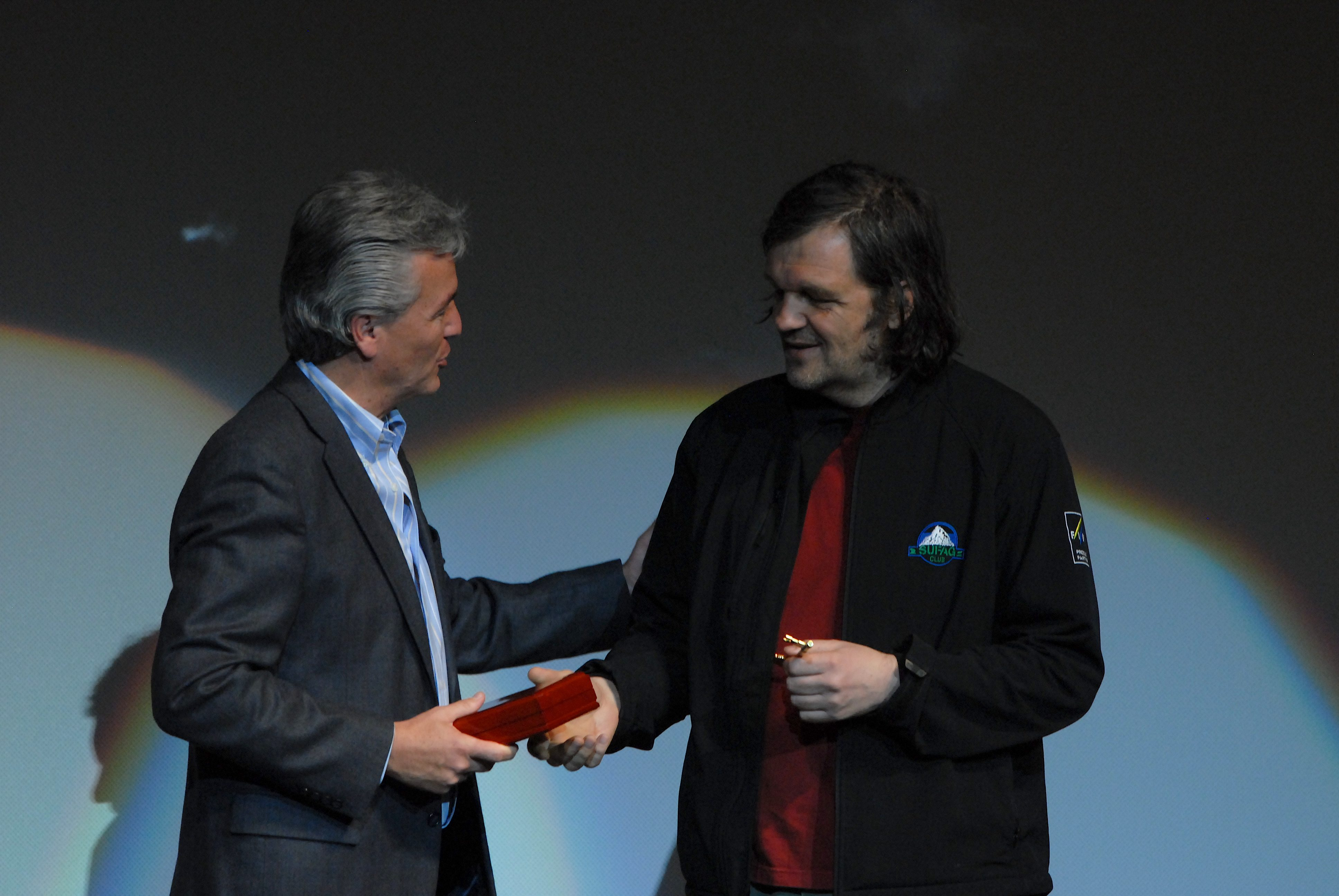
Mayor of Guadalajara Alfonso Petersen with Emir Kusturica at the Telmex Auditorium

The Mexican city of Guadalajara has served, since colonial times, as one of the strongest cultural hubs in the country and, as the capital of the state of Jalisco, it has absorbed, and contributed to adapt, many traditions from neighbouring towns and places. Being the second largest city in Mexico and the tenth most important city in Latin America, Guadalajara's cultural wealth has taken on an important role in the social, professional and economic sectors. Many well-known Mexican symbols have their origin in or around Guadalajara such as tequila, mariachi music, and, more recently, contemporary music such as electronic and rock music.

Guadalajara is a city with a great number of contemporary artists in the country; in dance, theatre, music, photography, cinema, design, architecture, etc.; it also has pioneers in the experimental arts. The federal government represents and supports the cultural movement, but the young people are a very important point in the diffusion, creation, support and consumption of the culture in Guadalajara, becoming a whole lifestyle for Guadalajaran young people. During the last couple of years the city has evolved into a dynamic meeting place for artists, educators and intellectuals.

Artists who were born here include Dr. Atl, Federico Fabregat, Mauricio Toussaint, Scott Neri, Luis Barragán, Paula Santiago, Jonathan Fraulin and Oscar Alvarado. Also ballet dancer Brenda Velez. Among others who took Guadalajara as their home are architects Alexander Zohn, David Rockwell and Mathias Goeritz and painters such as José Fors, Félix Bernardelli, Lucía Maya, Lewis Kant and José Clemente Orozco. Huichol musician Xavier Quijas Yxayotl was also born here. The renowned Nopal Beat Records label is based in Guadalajara. Art movement NeoSon was started in Guadalajara by a group of young musicians, being Josué one of its main exponents. Here was also born actor Enrique Álvarez Félix, who starred in Marisol.

Guadalajara was the 2005 American Capital of Culture.

Some of the events hosted in the city are:

- Guadalajara International Book Fair the second largest Book Fair in the world and the most important event of its kind in the Spanish-speaking world.
- Guadalajara International Film Festival considered the most prestigious film festival in Latin America. It was founded, among others, by Guillermo del Toro.
- CHROMA Independent non-profit visual arts festival. It is financed by ITESO and the University of Guadalajara.
