= Alameda metro station (Monterrey) =

Monterrey metro station

Alameda
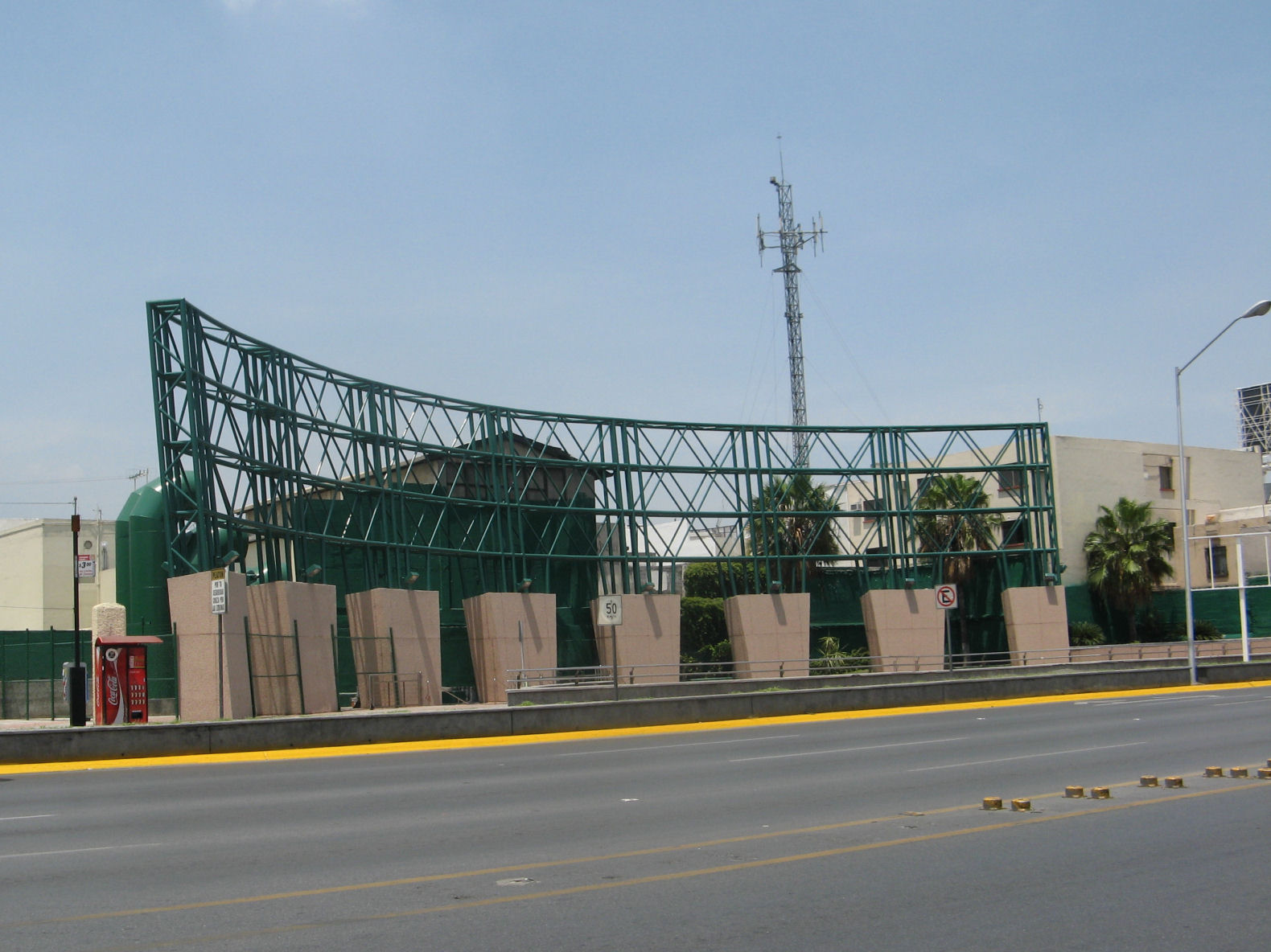

General information
- Location: Monterrey; Nuevo León, Mexico
- Coordinates: 25°40′37″N 100°19′06″W
- Operator: STC Metrorrey

Construction
- Accessible: Yes

History
- Opened: 30 November 1994

Services
Preceding station	Metrorrey	Following station
Cuauhtémoc toward Sendero	Line 2	Fundadores toward General I. Zaragoza
Location

The Alameda Station (Spanish: Estación Alameda) is a station on Line 2 of the Monterrey Metro. It is located in the intersection of Aramberri street and Cuauhtémoc Avenue in the Monterrey centre. The station was opened on 30 November 1994 as part of the inaugural section of Line 2, between General Anaya and Zaragoza.

This metro station serves the Monterrey centre, and is located one block away from the popular Alameda public park, from which the station takes its name. It is accessible for people with disabilities.

The logo represents the arches that are in the Parque Alameda.

== See also ==
- List of Monterrey metro stations
