= List of Metrorrey stations =

Map of the Monterrey Metro network.

The following is the list of the 40 stations of the Monterrey Metro system (also referred to as Metrorrey) of Monterrey, Nuevo León, Mexico, organized by line.

== Line 1 (yellow) Talleres – Exposición ==
Logo	Station	Station type	Coordinates	Comments
	Talleres	Ground Level	25°45′14″N 100°21′55″W	Terminal
	San Bernabé	Elevated	25°44′54″N 100°21′42″W	Former terminal
	Unidad Modelo	Elevated	25°44′31″N 100°21′18″W	
	Aztlán	Elevated	25°43′56″N 100°20′51″W	
	Penitenciaría	Elevated	25°43′24″N 100°20′33″W	
	Alfonso Reyes	Elevated	25°42′58″N 100°20′33″W	
	Mitras	Elevated	25°42′20″N 100°20′33″W	
	Simón Bolívar	Elevated	25°42′20″N 100°20′33″W	
	Hospital	Elevated	25°41′31″N 100°20′39″W	Near the UANL Medical Campus and the University Hospital (Hospital Civil).
	Edison	Elevated	25°41′13″N 100°20′01″W	In the intersection of Edison street and Colon Avenue
	Central	Elevated	25°41′13″N 100°19′28″W	One block from the main bus station.
	Cuauhtémoc	Elevated	25°41′10″N 100°19′01″W	Transfer station; connects with line 2
	Del Golfo	Elevated	25°41′06″N 100°18′24″W	
	Félix U. Gómez	Elevated	25°41′02″N 100°17′48″W	Transfer station; connects with line 3
	Arena Monterrey	Elevated	25°41′01″N 100°17′17″W	renamed on 26 March 2026
	Y Griega	Elevated	25°40′59.96″N 100°16′45.60″W	Near Fundidora Park
	Eloy Cavazos	Elevated	25°40′48″N 100°15′51″W	
	Lerdo de Tejada	Elevated	25°40′47″N 100°15′10″W	
	Exposición	Elevated	25°40′46″N 100°14′44″W	Terminal

== Line 2 (green) Sendero – General I. Zaragoza ==
Logo	Station	Station type	Coordinates	Comments
	Sendero	Elevated	25°46′07″N 100°17′34″W	Terminal
	Tapia	Elevated	25°45′33.34″N 100°17′44.44″W	
	San Nicolás	Elevated	25°45′09.42″N 100°17′52.98″W	Next to Clinica 6 of IMSS
	Anáhuac	Elevated	25°44′25″N 100°18′09″W	Near the Anáhuac neighborhood
	Universidad	Elevated	25°43′28″N 100°18′30″W	Former Terminal Station, Next to UANL
	Niños Héroes	Elevated	25°43′02″N 100°18′40″W	Near Parque Niños Héroes and Estadio de Béisbol Monterrey
	Regina	Underground	25°42′28″N 100°18′51″W	3 blocks away from the Monumental Monterrey bullfight ring
	General Anaya	Underground	25°41′49″N 100°19′00″W	Former terminal
	Cuauhtémoc	Underground	25°41′10″N 100°19′01″W	Transfer station; connects with line 1
	Alameda	Underground	25°40′37″N 100°19′06″W	
	Fundadores	Underground	25°40′22″N 100°19′11″W	
	Padre Mier	Underground	25°40′08″N 100°18′56″W	
	General I. Zaragoza	Underground	25°40′04″N 100°18′37″W	Terminal and transfer station; connects with line 3. Located on the Macroplaza. Near MARCO Museum

== Line 3 (orange) Hospital Metropolitano – General I. Zaragoza ==
Logo	Station	Station type	Coordinates	Comments
	Hospital Metropolitano	Elevated		Terminal
	Los Ángeles	Elevated		
	Ruiz Cortines	Elevated		
	Colonia Moderna	Elevated		
	Metalúrgicos	Elevated		
	Félix U. Gómez	Elevated		Transfer station; connects with line 1
	Colonia Obrera	Elevated		
	Santa Lucía	Elevated		
	General I. Zaragoza	Underground		Terminal and transfer station; connects with line 2
