= Fundadores metro station =

Monterrey metro station

Fundadores
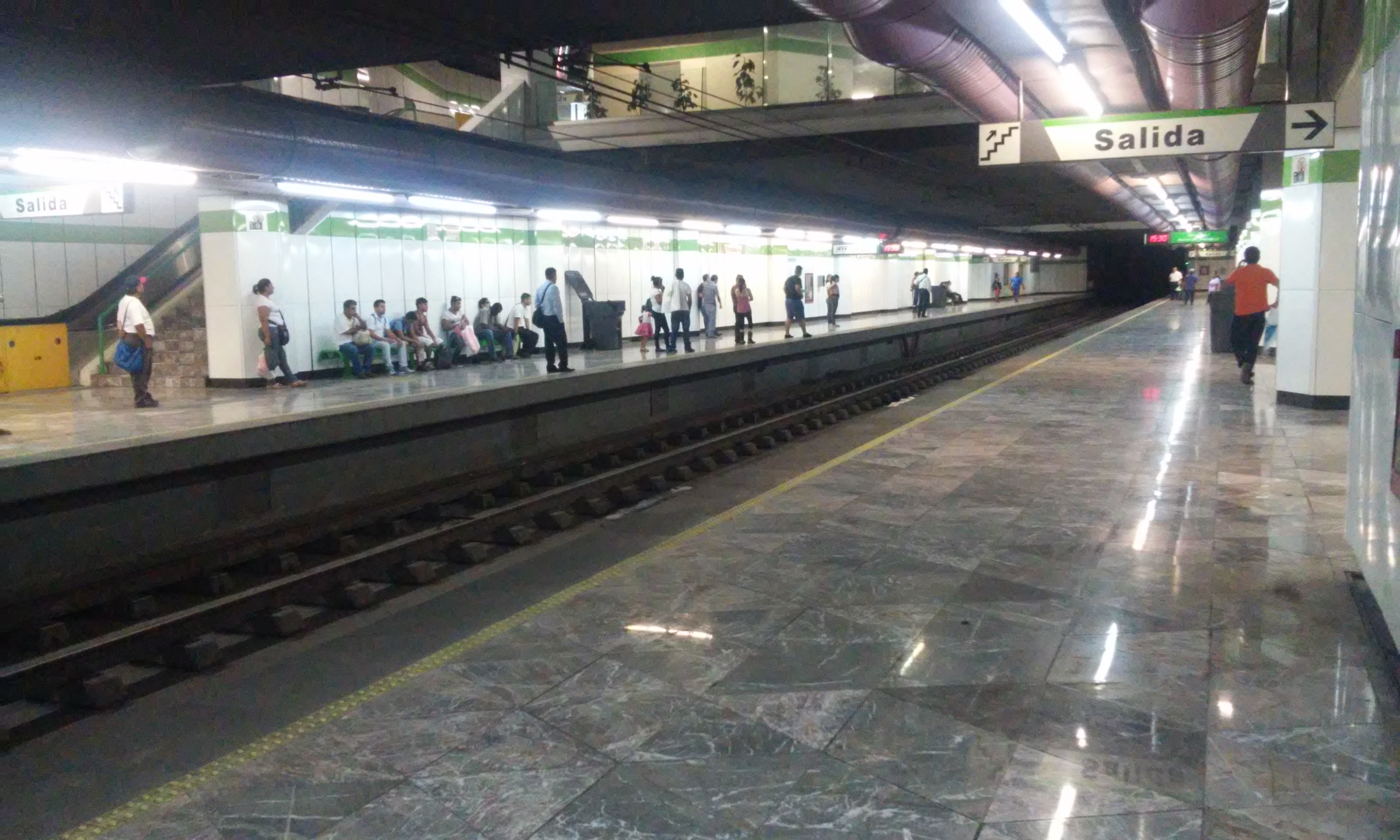

General information
- Location: Monterrey; Nuevo León, Mexico
- Coordinates: 25°40′22″N 100°19′11″W
- Operator: STC Metrorrey

History
- Opened: 30 November 1994

Services
Preceding station	Metrorrey	Following station
Alameda toward Sendero	Line 2	Padre Mier toward General I. Zaragoza
Location

The Fundadores Station (Spanish: Estación Fundadores) is a station on Line 2 of the Monterrey Metro. It is located in the intersection of 15 de Mayo street and Cuauhtémoc Avenue in the Monterrey centre. The station was opened on 30 November 1994 as part of the inaugural section of Line 2, between General Anaya and Zaragoza.

This station serves the Monterrey centre, and it is located next to the IMSS Hospital No 21, the "Plaza Commercial Fundadores" and the busy Juan Ignacio Ramon street. It is accessible for people with disabilities.

This station is one block away from the Monterrey Foundation (hence the name Fundadores which is Spanish for "founders"), and its logo represents the obelisk that is placed in there.

== See also ==
- List of Monterrey metro stations
