= Niños Héroes metro station (Monterrey) =

Monterrey metro station

Niños Héroes
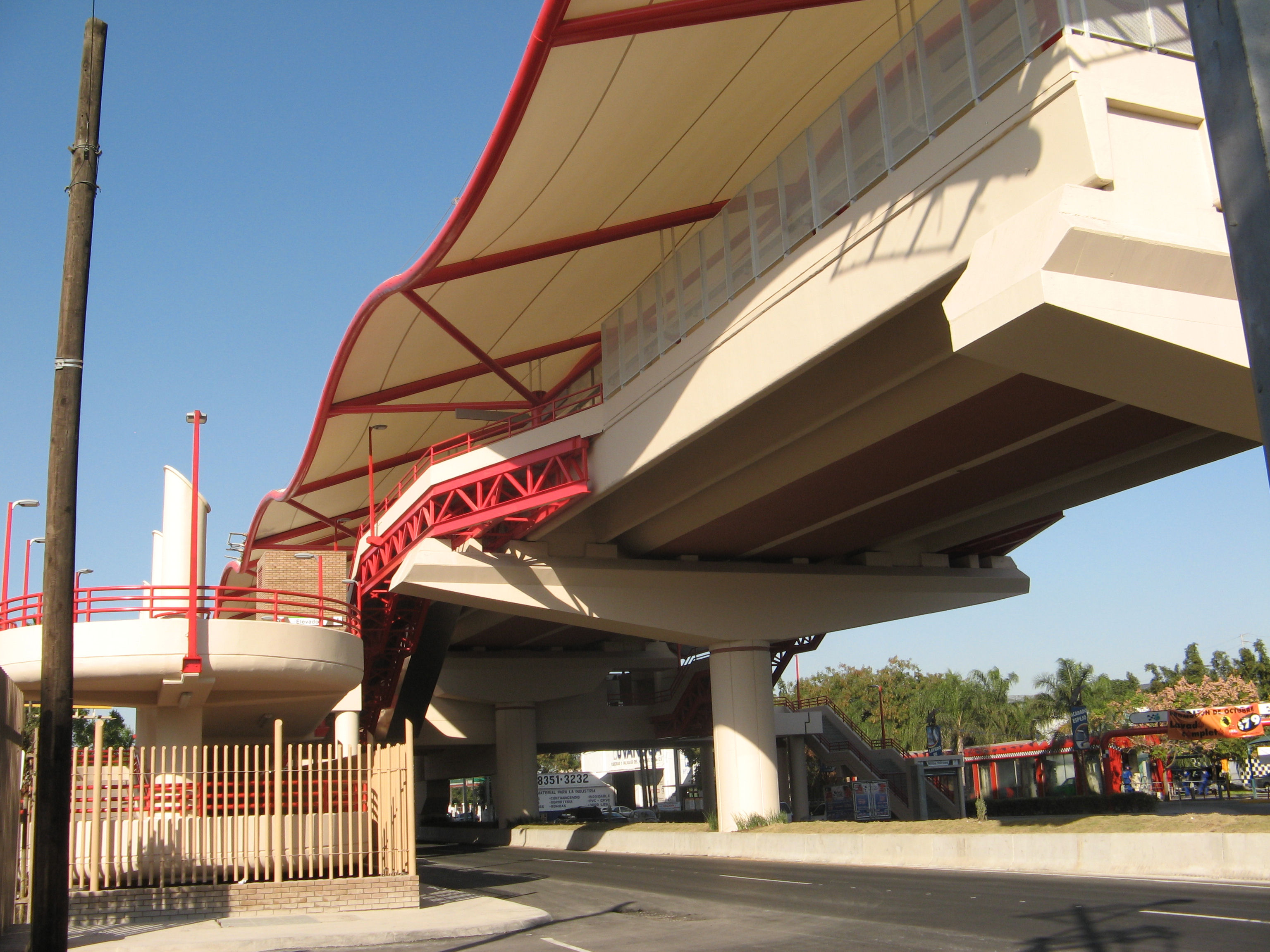

General information
- Location: Monterrey; Nuevo León, Mexico
- Coordinates: 25°43′02″N 100°18′40″W
- Operator: STC Metrorrey

History
- Opened: 31 October 2007

Services
Preceding station	Metrorrey	Following station
Universidad toward Sendero	Line 2	Regina toward General I. Zaragoza
Location

The Niños Héroes Station (Spanish: Estación Niños Héroes) is a station on Line 2 of the Monterrey Metro. It is located in the intersection of Alfonso Reyes and Ciudad de Los Ángeles Avenues.

This station is next to the Niños Héroes Park (from which the station takes its name), it's also near the Raúl Rangel Frías Library of the University of Nuevo León, the Nuevo León Cycling track, and the Estadio de Béisbol Monterrey. It is accessible for people with disabilities.

This station's logo represents a stylized headshot of a "Niño Héroe" (one of the hero boys that died defending the country against the American invasion in 1847).

This station was inaugurated on October 31, 2007 as part of the first stage of the Line 2 expansion (along with Regina Station and Universidad).

== See also ==
- List of Monterrey metro stations
