= Cuauhtémoc metro station (Monterrey) =

Monterrey metro station

Cuauhtémoc
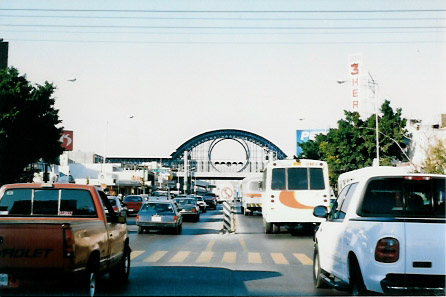
- View from Av. Cuauhtémoc

General information
- Location: Monterrey; Nuevo León, Mexico
- Coordinates: 25°41′10″N 100°19′01″W
- Operator: STC Metrorrey

Construction
- Accessible: Yes

History
- Opened: 25 April 1991; 35 years ago

Services
Preceding station	Metrorrey	Following station
Central toward Talleres	Line 1	Del Golfo toward Exposición
General Anaya toward Sendero	Line 2	Alameda toward General I. Zaragoza
Location

The Cuauhtémoc Station (Spanish: Estación Cuauhtémoc) is a station on the Monterrey Metro. It is located in the north end of Cuauhtémoc Avenue, in the north side of downtown Monterrey. The Line 1 station was opened on 25 April 1991 as part of the inaugural section of Line 1, going from San Bernabé to Exposición.

Cuauhtémoc station is the most important station on the Metrorrey System, as it serves as the only transfer between Line 1 and Line 2. In the transfer point between lines, this station has stores that range from clothing to mobile phones, it also features a photo gallery on the advancement of the Line 2 expansion works.

This station is named after Cuauhtémoc Avenue, and its logo represents a stylized headshot of Cuauhtémoc, an important Aztec ruler.

This station is accessible for people with disabilities.

The Line 2 station was opened on 30 November 1994 as part of the inaugural section of Line 2, between General Anaya and Zaragoza. After the inauguration of the extended Line 2 by President Felipe Calderón and other dignitaries, ridership on the Monterrey Metro system surged from 260,000 per day to 334,000 per day. Cuauhtémoc, San Nicolás, and Alameda were the stations that saw the greatest increase in passenger use and many riders were delayed before service adjustments could be made.

== Line 1 ==
Station Type	Comments
Elevated	The elevated part of the station belongs to the Yellow Line, it's the only station in Line 1 that connects to Line 2 (Green Line). To the west it goes to Central station and to the east to Del Golfo station.

== Line 2 ==
Station Type	Comments	Photo
Underground	The underground part of the station belongs to the Green Line, it connects to Line 1 (Yellow Line), it has 3 platforms (2 on the sides and 1 in the middle). To the north it goes to General Anaya Terminal station and to the south to Alameda station.	
