= Anáhuac metro station =

Monterrey metro station

Anáhuac
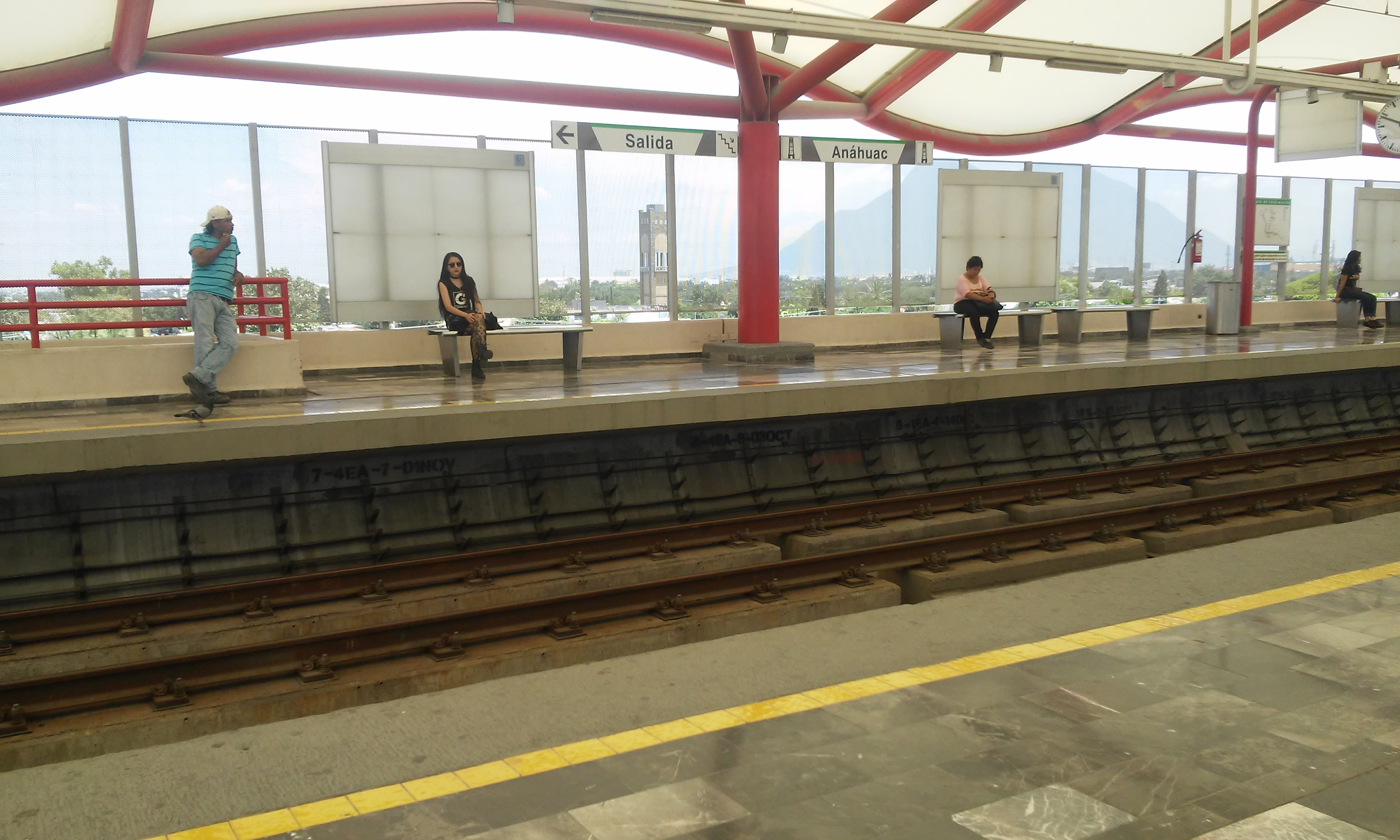
- The elevated station during construction

General information
- Location: San Nicolás de los Garza; Nuevo León, Mexico
- Coordinates: 25°44′25″N 100°18′09″W
- Operator: STC Metrorrey

History
- Opened: 1 October 2008

Services
Preceding station	Metrorrey	Following station
San Nicolás toward Sendero	Line 2	Universidad toward General I. Zaragoza
Location

The Anáhuac Station (Spanish: Estación Anáhuac) is part of the expansion of Line 2 of the Monterrey Metro.

This station was planned to be a hub for the "Transmetro" BRT program, but those plans were later scrapped.

This station serves the San Nicolás centre and the Anahuác neighborhood, from which the station takes its name. It is accessible for people with disabilities.

Its logo represents the tower of the House of Culture La Pérgola, which is representative of the neighborhood. The station was opened on 1 October 2008 as part of the extension of the line from Universidad and Sendero.

== See also ==
- List of Monterrey metro stations
