= Jan Hendrix =

Dutch-born artist (born 1949)

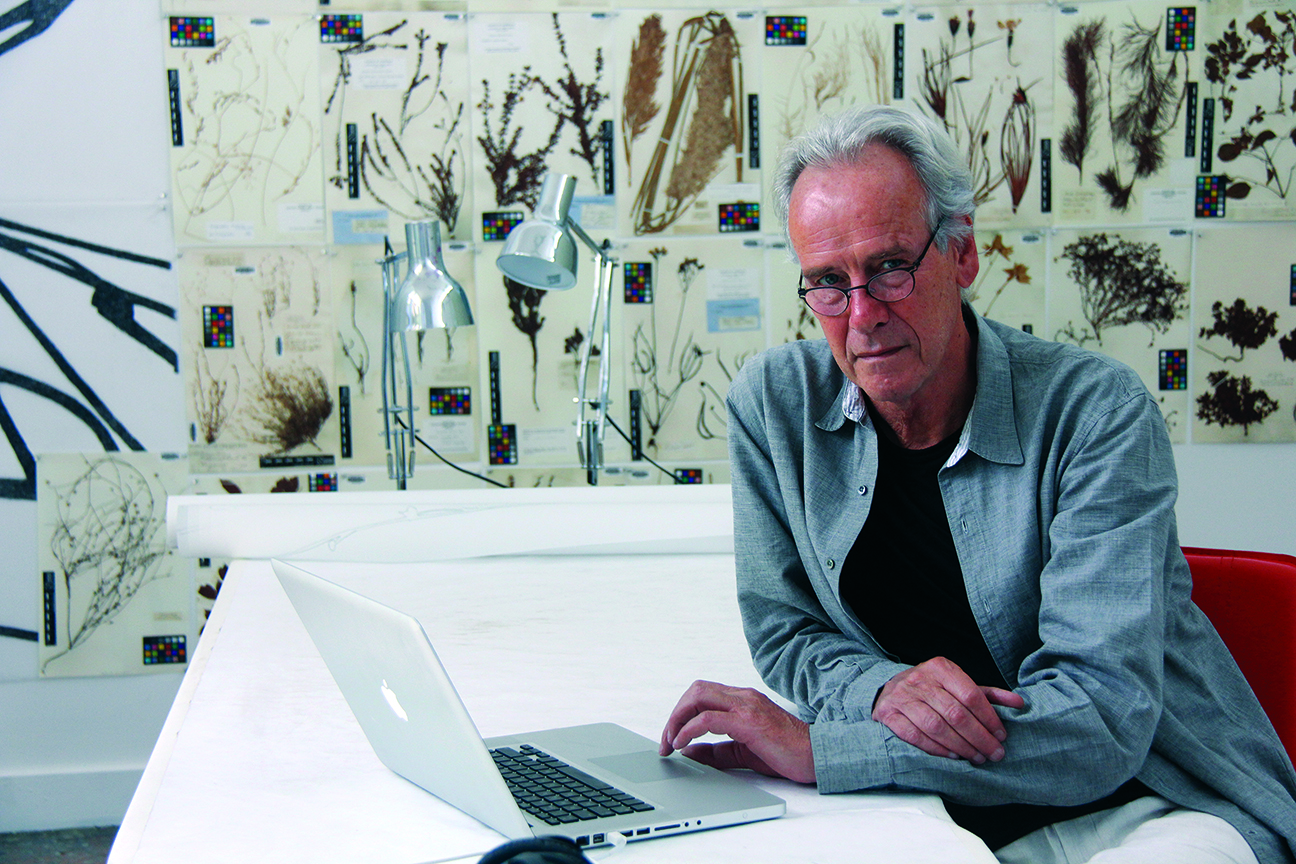
- Jan Hendrix in 2011.
- Born: Maasbree, The Netherlands
- Known for: Painting, sculpture
- Notable work: Kiosko (2009)
- Style: Contemporary
- Awards: Order of the Aztec Eagle; 2012
- Website: janhendrix.com.mx

Jan Hendrix (Maasbree, Netherlands, 28 July 1949) is a Dutch-born artist who has lived and worked in Mexico since 1978. Hendrix received the Order of the Aztec Eagle from the Mexican government for his work in art and architecture.

== Art ==
All projects start with drawing and go through different processes, which are in turn translated into final works. These range from artist's books, print editions, enamel installations, etched glass and paintings to architectural projects. Through his work Hendrix explores the dissection of a chosen landscape into details and composition, structure and flora. Among many projects, over the last years Hendrix has focused on the first gathering of plants at Kamay Botany Bay by Joseph Banks, Daniel Solander and Sydney Parkinson; part of the HMS Endeavour expedition of 1770, 250 years ago.

Since the 2000s, he has held an average of three to four exhibitions each year. In the 1970s and early 1980s, he started with multiple exhibitions at galleries in the Netherlands such as Agora Studio in Maastricht and Printshop and Galerie Clement in Amsterdam then the Galería de Arte Mexicano in Mexico City after he took up residence. He began exhibiting solo in 1975 and since has participated in both solo and group exhibitions in Mexico, Europe, the United States, Asia and Africa.

A number of these were major exhibitions which toured in multiple places. Bitacora consists of images from various countries. It was exhibited in the Wan Fung Gallery in Beijing, Zhu Qi-Zhan Museum in Shanghai, Erasmushuis, in Djakarta, UTS Gallery Sydney, Tropenmuseum, Amsterdam, Museum of Painting and Sculpture in Ankara and the Centro de la Imagen, Mexico City. Storyboard was exhibited in the Instituto Cultural Cabañas in Guadalajara, Museo Amparo, Puebla and Museo de Arte Contemporáneo de Monterrey. Botánica was exhibited at the Calcografía Nacional de España in Madrid, Espacio Cultural Metropolitano in Tampico, Museo de Arte in Querétaro, Centro Cultural Tijuana, Galería de Arte Mexicano in Mexico City.

Hendrix donated sixty paintings as part of the Trabjajo de Campo exhibition to the Secretariat of Finance and Public Credit of Mexico to keep the pieces together. The works are based on photographs of landscapes from Kenya, Egypt, other parts of Africa, Australia, China and Mexico.

He work can be found in numerous public and private collections in various parts of the world including, Instituto Nacional de Bellas Artes y Literatura, National Council for Culture and Arts of Mexico, Hiscox in London, Institution Ferial de Extremadura, Junta de Extremadura, the Bankinter Collection, the Baker & McKenzie Collection, the Caixanova Collection, the Museo de la Comunidad de Madrid, Rodriguez Acosta Foundation in Granada, Bibliothèque nationale de France, Bonnefanten Museum, Fundación Cultural Televisa, Institution de Artes Gráficas in Oaxaca, Museum Von Bommel and Tropenmuseum in Amsterdam, Museo Universitario de Ciencias y Arte of UNAM and Irish Museum of Modern Art.

== Published works ==
He has collaborated with various writers to design and illustrate their books including Gabriel García Márquez, Seamus Heaney and Bert Schierbeek, with books containing his work published in Mexico, Spain and England. These include The Golden Bough (1992), Light of the Leaves (1999), Vivir para contarla (2004) and After Nature (Spanish language version) in 2005. Most contain serigraphs.

== Architectural work ==
A portion of his work since the 2000s has been murals and other works related to architecture, collaborating with numerous architects. His first architectural project was in the Hotel Habita working with Enrique Norten and Bernardo Gomez-Pimienta . He did enameled murals at the Punta del Parque building and entrance mural at the Atelier Building in Santa Fe, Mexico City . The lighted ceiling designed by Hendrix of the Rosario Castellanos Library is the most attractive element of the Centro Cultural Bella Época in Colonia Condesa. It is made of glass with abstract shapes in black and white and creates the sensation of being under the canopy of a jungle. He worked on the facade of Universidad Autónoma Metropolitana-Iztapalapa with Alberto Garcia Lascurain, as well as the facade of the Centro de Diseño, Cine y Television in Mexico City. He collaborated with the Arditti architectural firm for the Museo de Memoria y Tolerancia and with architect Ricardo Legorreta for the student center of Education City of the Qatar Foundation.

== Other activities ==
In the 1990s, Hendrix worked on set designs for the National Theatre Company of Mexico at the request of Alejandro Luna, as well as the set for the monologue Keisho/Maquillaje in Mexico City. From the 1970s to the present, he has been a guest lecturer or otherwise taught at the Akademie voor Kunst en Industrie in Enschede, the Netherlands, the Centro de Investigación y Experimentación Plástica in Mexico City, the Jan Van Eyck Akademie in Maastricht, Centro Nacional de las Artes in Mexico City, Bilboarte in Bilbao, Spain and the Centro Cultural Tijuana, in Tijuana, Mexico. His first residency was in 1999 at the Villa Serbelloni in Triangolo lariano, Italy, sponsored by the Rockefeller Foundation. Others since then have been with the Budanon Trust in Budanon, Australia, Centro de las Arte de San Agustin in San Agustín Etla, Oaxaca and the Cesar Manrique Foundation in Lanzarote, Canary Islands. In 2006, he was curator for the exhibition Alarca, 54 artistas contemporáneos. Talavera de la Reyna" at the Beijing National Fine Arts Museum. He has been a part of the Sistema Nacional de Creadores de Arte from 1993 to 1999 and again from 2004 to 2007.

== Recognition ==
In 2012, the artist was awarded the Order of the Aztec Eagle, the highest Mexican award given to foreigners for his work in art and architecture. He is the third Dutchman to receive the honor.

== See also ==
- Kiosko (Hendrix)
