= Padre Mier metro station =

Monterrey metro station

Padre Mier
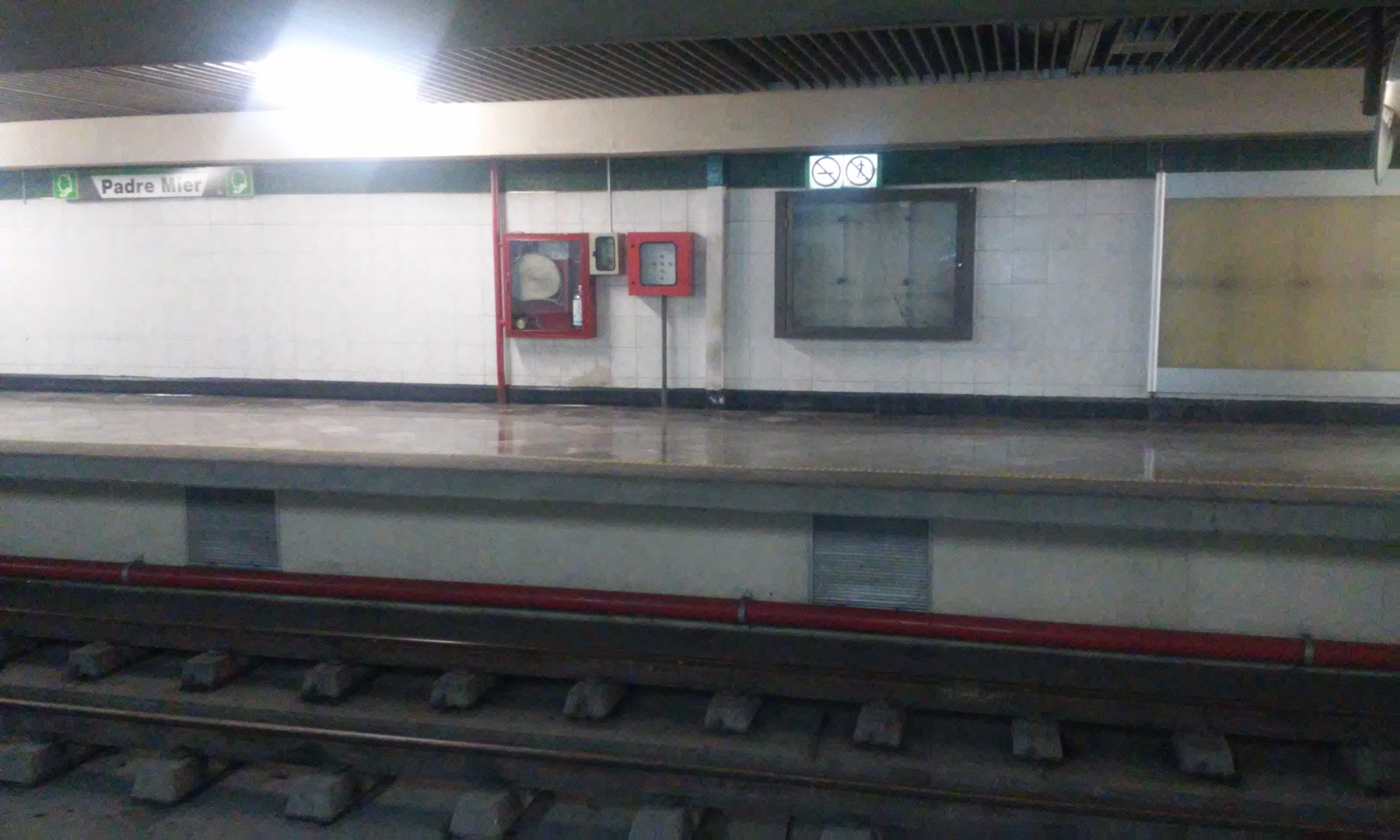

General information
- Location: Monterrey; Nuevo León, Mexico
- Coordinates: 25°40′08″N 100°18′56″W
- Operator: STC Metrorrey

History
- Opened: 30 November 1994

Services
Preceding station	Metrorrey	Following station
Fundadores toward Sendero	Line 2	General I. Zaragoza Terminus
Location

The Padre Mier Station (Spanish: Estación Padre Mier) is a station on Line 2 of the Monterrey Metro. It is located in the intersection of Padre Mier street and Juarez Avenue in the Monterrey centre. The station was opened on 30 November 1994 as part of the inaugural section of Line 2, between General Anaya and Zaragoza.

This station serves the heart of the Monterrey shopping district, it is one block away of Morelos street, and Monterrey's Zona Rosa. It is accessible for people with disabilities.

This station is named after Padre Mier street, and its logo represents a stylized headshot of Fray Servando Teresa de Mier (Padre Mier), an important cleric and politician who played a key part in Mexico's Independence.

== Maintenance improvements ==
On February 10, 2023, all exits but the eastern exit were closed for improvements to the deteriorating station.

On April 1, 2023, the station, alongside Alameda and Fundadores stations, were completely closed, with a bus service between Zaragoza and Cuauhtémoc stations.

On May 10, 2023, Padre Mier was reopened, receiving a new and modern look with dark wall colors and stylish light fixtures including the Metrorrey logo, Monterrey’s famous hill Cerro de la Silla, and a lion representing the state Monterrey is located in, Nuevo León.

== See also ==
- List of Monterrey metro stations
