= Regina metro station =

Monterrey metro station

Regina
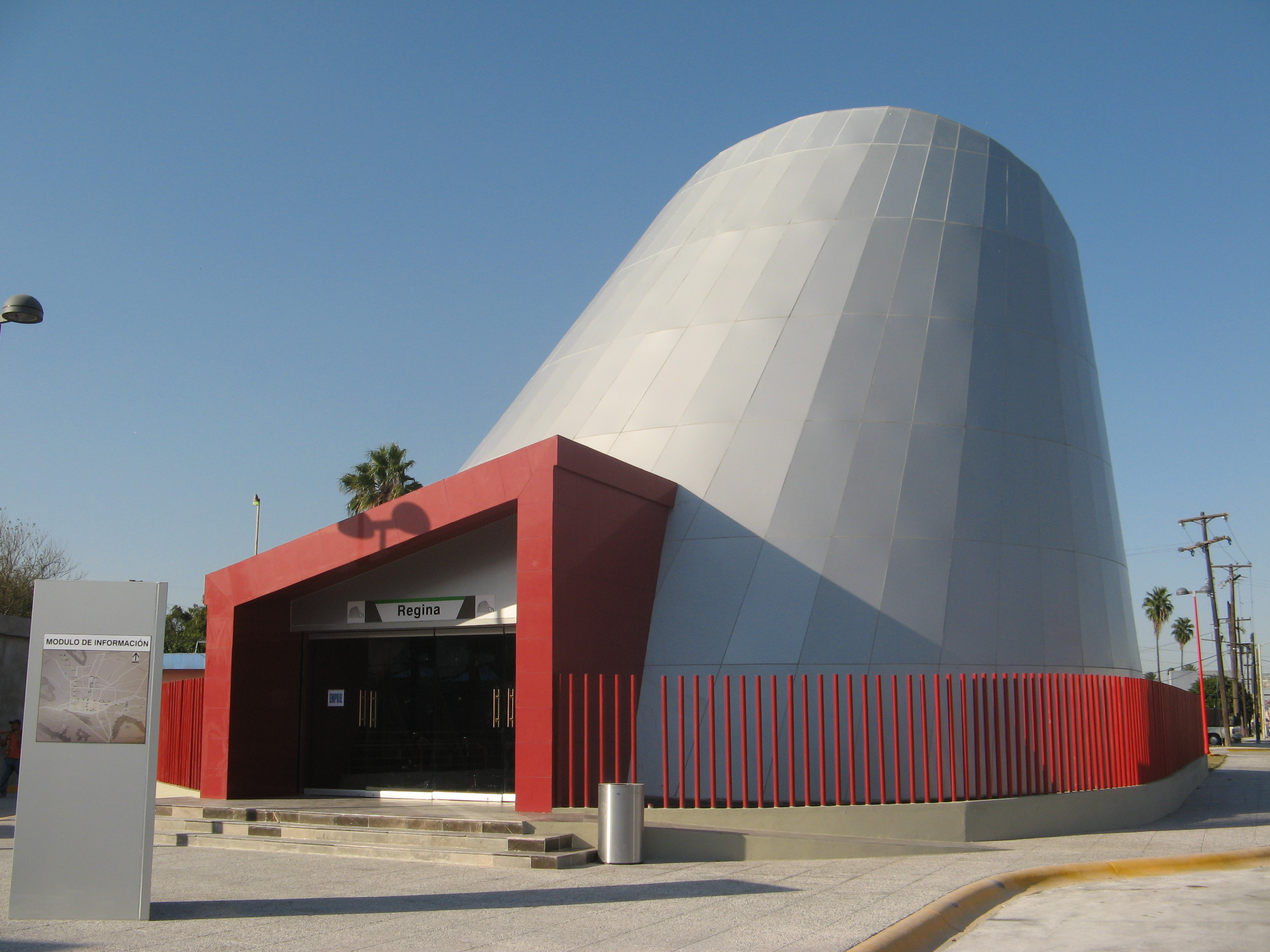
- One of the two truncated cone entrances

General information
- Location: Monterrey; Nuevo León, Mexico
- Coordinates: 25°42′28″N 100°18′51″W
- Operator: STC Metrorrey

History
- Opened: 31 October 2007

Services
Preceding station	Metrorrey	Following station
Niños Héroes toward Sendero	Line 2	General Anaya toward General I. Zaragoza
Location

The Regina Station (Spanish: Estación Regina) is a station on Line 2 of the Monterrey Metro. It is located along Alfonso Reyes Avenue where it is intersected by Juan Sánchez Azcona street.

This station is three blocks away from the Monumental Monterrey (Monterrey's main Bullfighting ring) and across the street from the Coca-Cola bottler. Its logo represents the architecture of the station's entrance, and it is accessible for people with disabilities.

This station was inaugurated on October 31, 2007. It was part of the first stage of the Line 2 expansion (along with Niños Heroes Station and Universidad), being the only underground station of the Line 2 extension project.

== See also ==
- List of Monterrey metro stations
