= Santiago Tapia metro station =

Monterrey metro station

Santiago Tapia
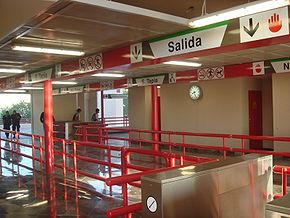

General information
- Location: San Nicolás de los Garza; Nuevo León, Mexico
- Coordinates: 25°45′34″N 100°17′44″W
- Operator: STC Metrorrey

Construction
- Accessible: Yes

History
- Opened: October 1, 2008

Services
Preceding station	Metrorrey	Following station
Sendero Terminus	Line 2	San Nicolás toward General I. Zaragoza
Location

Santiago Tapia is one of the Metro stations of the Monterrey Metro line 2. It is located in the north of the Mexican city of San Nicolás de los Garza and it was opened on 1 October 2008 as part of the extension of the line from Universidad and Sendero.

This metro station bears the name of the revolutionary men born in 1820 and is located over the street of the same name.

== See also ==
- List of Monterrey metro stations
