= San Nicolás metro station =

Monterrey metro station

San Nicolás

General information
- Location: San Nicolás de los Garza; Nuevo León, Mexico
- Coordinates: 25°45′09″N 100°17′53″W
- Operator: STC Metrorrey

History
- Opened: 1 October 2008

Services
Preceding station	Metrorrey	Following station
Santiago Tapia toward Sendero	Line 2	Anáhuac toward General I. Zaragoza
Location

The San Nicolás Station (Spanish: Estación San Nicolás) is a metro station along Line 2 of the Monterrey Metro. It is located near the IMSS Zone Hospital No. 6. The station was opened on 1 October 2008 as part of the extension of the line from Universidad and Sendero. It is an elevated station built into the median of Mexican Federal Highway 85 where it intersects Benito Juárez Avenue. The station's original name was to be Juárez, but was changed to San Nicolás because of its location in the center of the city of San Nicolás de los Garza. The logo for the station depicts the church of the namesake Iglesia San Nicolás Tolentino.
