= Julio Galán =

Mexican artist and architect

- Born: Julio Galán; December 5, 1958; Muzquiz, Mexico
- Died: August 4, 2006 (aged 47)
- Education: University of Monterrey
- Known for: Neo-expressionist painting and collage and architecture
- Movement: Neo-expressionism
- Awards: Premio Marco, Museo de Arte Contemporáneo de Monterrey (1994)

Julio Galán (December 5, 1958 – August 4, 2006) was a Mexican artist and architect. Galán was one of Latin America's neo-expressionist painters of the end of the last century and the beginning of this one. His paintings and collages are full of elements that usually represent his life.

== Biography ==
Galán was born into a wealthy and conservative Roman Catholic family in Muzquiz, a northern Mexican mining town. As a child he attended private school in Monterrey, Mexico and later enrolled to study architecture at the University of Monterrey. Galán started his career in this town.

While in Mexico, Galán painted dresses for fashion designer Nicole Miller, who introduced him to Paige Powell. Powell worked for Andy Warhol at Interview magazine in New York. Warhol printed several of Galán's works in Interview, and shortly after Galán moved to New York City in 1984.

Powell organized two shows for the artist in New York City. His first New York show was scheduled to open at an Upper West Side apartment in June 1985 where Powell had previously organized a show, but it was canceled when the board of directors of the co-op building banned the exhibition. Mexican ambassador Joaquín Bernal allowed Powell to use the Consul General gallery in Midtown South for Galán's show. The opening of the exhibition coincided with the Mexico City earthquake on September 19, 1985.

Following that show, Galán participated in the exhibition Mexico, The New Generation at the San Antonio Museum of Art in San Antonio, Texas. In the fall of 1986, Powell organized another solo show for the Galán at art critic Edit DeAk's apartment in SoHo.

From 1980 to 1998, Galán was represented by art dealer Annina Nosei and he has various shows at her gallery in New York. He also had shows internationally, including the Gallerie Barbara Farber in Amsterdam and the Galleria Gian Enzo Sperone in Rome.

In 1994 he won the "Premio Marco" from the Museo de Arte Contemporaneo de Monterrey. That same year he exhibited at the Center for Fine Arts in Miami, Florida, the Museo de Arte Moderno in México City, and the Contemporary Art Museum of Houston, Texas.

Galán died on a plane that was taking him back to Monterrey after suffering a brain hemorrhage on August 4, 2006.

== Selected solo exhibitions ==
Galán had solo exhibitions at the following art institutions:

- 1980: Galeria Arte Actual Mexicano, Monterrey, Mexico
- 1982: Galeria Arte Actual Mexicano, Monterrey, Mexico
- 1982: Galeria Arvil, Mexico
- 1983: Galeria Arte Actual Mexicano, Monterrey, Mexico
- 1984: Galeria Uno, Puerto Vallarta, Mexico
- 1984: Galeria Clave, Guadalajara, Mexico
- 1985: Consulate General of Mexico, New York
- 1985: Art Mart Gallery, New York
- 1986: Barbara Farber Gallery, Amsterdam, Holland
- 1986: Edit DeAk's loft, New York, United States
- 1987: Museo de Monterrey, Mexico; Museo de Arte Moderno, Mexico; MuseoRegional de Guadalajara, Mexico
- 1987: Annina Nosei Gallery, New York, United States
- 1988: Museo de Monterrey, Mexico
- 1988: Museo de Arte Moderno, Mexico
- 1988: Galerie Barbara Farber, Amsterdam, Holland
- 1989: Annina Nosei Gallery, New York, United States
- 1990: Annina Nosei Gallery, New York, United States
- 1990: Galleria Gian Enzo Sperone, Rome, Italy
- 1990: Witte de With Center for Contemporary Art, Rotterdam, Holland
- 1990: Museo de Arte Moderno, Mexico City, Mexico
- 1991: Milagros Gallery, San Antonio, Texas, United States
- 1992: Annina Nosei Gallery, New York, United States
- 1992: Galerie Barbara Faber, Amsterdam, Holland
- 1992: Stedelijk Museum, Amsterdam, Holland
- 1992: Pabellón Mudéjar, Seville, Spain
- 1993: Dark Music, Pittsburg Center for the Arts, Pittsburg. United States
- 1994: Contemporary Art Museum, Houston, Texas, United States
- 1994: Museo de Arte Contemporaneo de Monterrey, Mexico
- 1994: Museo de Arte Moderno, Mexico City, Mexico
- 1994: Center for the Fine Arts, Miami, United States
- 1995: Galerie Thaddaeus Ropac, Paris, France
- 1996: Barbara Farber Gallery, Amsterdam, Holland
- 1996: Annina Nosei Gallery, New York, United States
- 1997: Oro Poderoso, Galeria Ramis Barquet N.Y. at Robert Miller Gallery, New York, United States
- 1998: Enrique Guerrero, Mexico
- 1998: Galerie Thaddaeus Ropac, Paris, France
- 2001: My Mirrors, Robert Miller Gallery, New York, United States
- 2007: Museo de Arte Contemporáneo de Monterrey (MARCO), Monterrey, México.
- 2008: Museo Amparo, Puebla, México
- 2008: Antiguo Colegio de San Ildefonso, Ciudad de México, México.
- 2023: Museo de Arte Contemporáneo de Monterrey (MARCO), Monterrey, México.
