= Kiosko (Hendrix) =

Sculpture in Puebla, Mexico

- Refugio
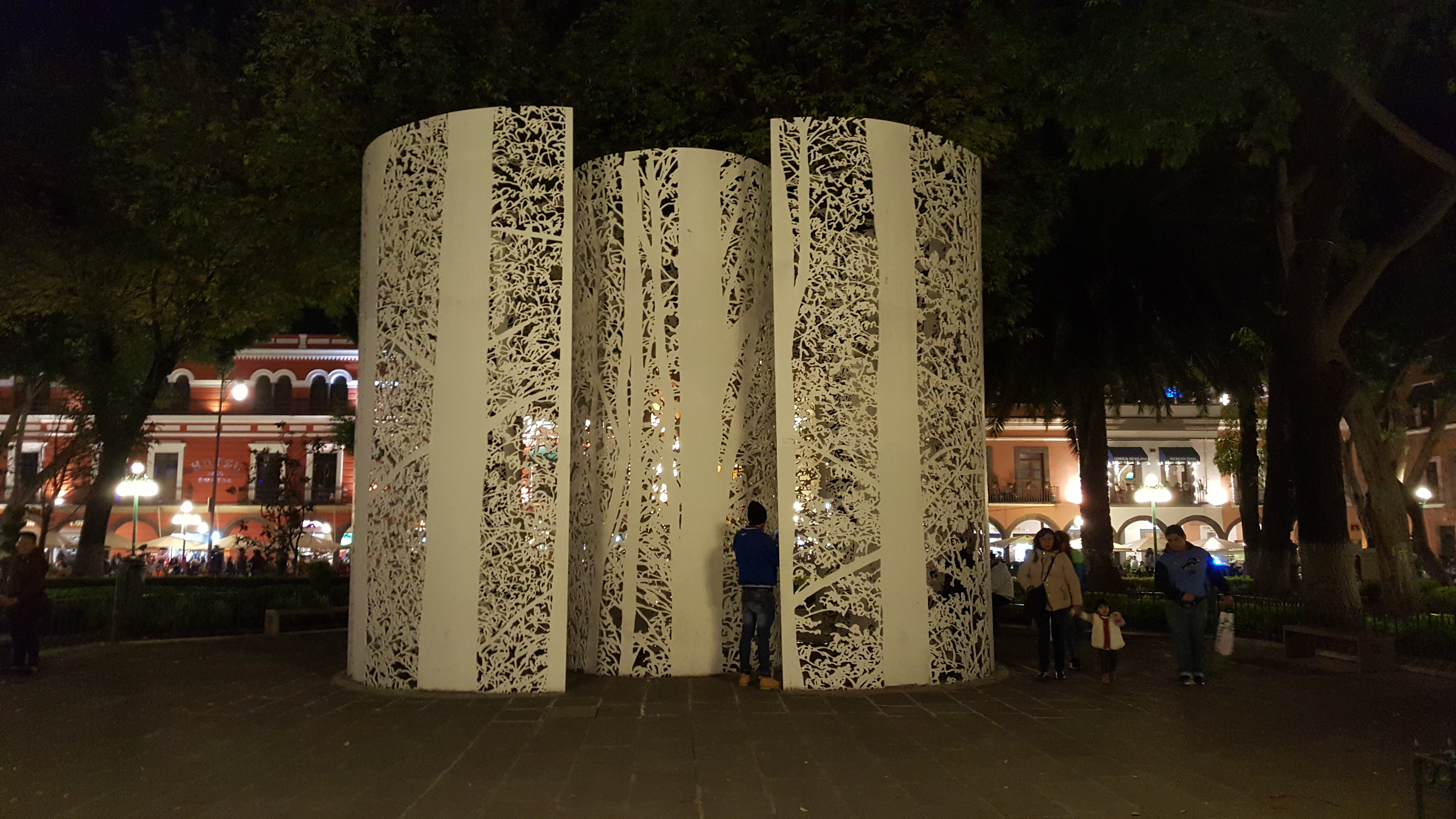
- The sculpture in 2018
- Artist: Jan Hendrix
- Year: 20 July 2009
- Medium: Aluminium cut out and baked with white ceramic paint
- Movement: Contemporary art
- Dimensions: 6 m (20 ft) × 4.8 m (16 ft) × 4.8 m (16 ft)
- Location: Puebla, Puebla, Mexico; 19°2′36.7″N 98°11′52.1″W
- Website: janhendrix.com.mx

Kiosko (lit. transl. "pavilion" or "gazebo"), alternatively known as Refugio (lit. transl. "shelter"), is a 2009 outdoor contemporary art sculpture by Dutch artist Jan Hendrix, installed in the Zócalo (main square) of the city of Puebla, in the Mexican state of the same name. It was requested by the Fundación Amparo to honour philanthropist Ángeles Espinosa Yglesias. The sculpture consists of two aluminium cylinders painted white and cut to resemble tree foliage. Critics have highlighted the integration of the sculpture's design with its surroundings.

== Description and history ==
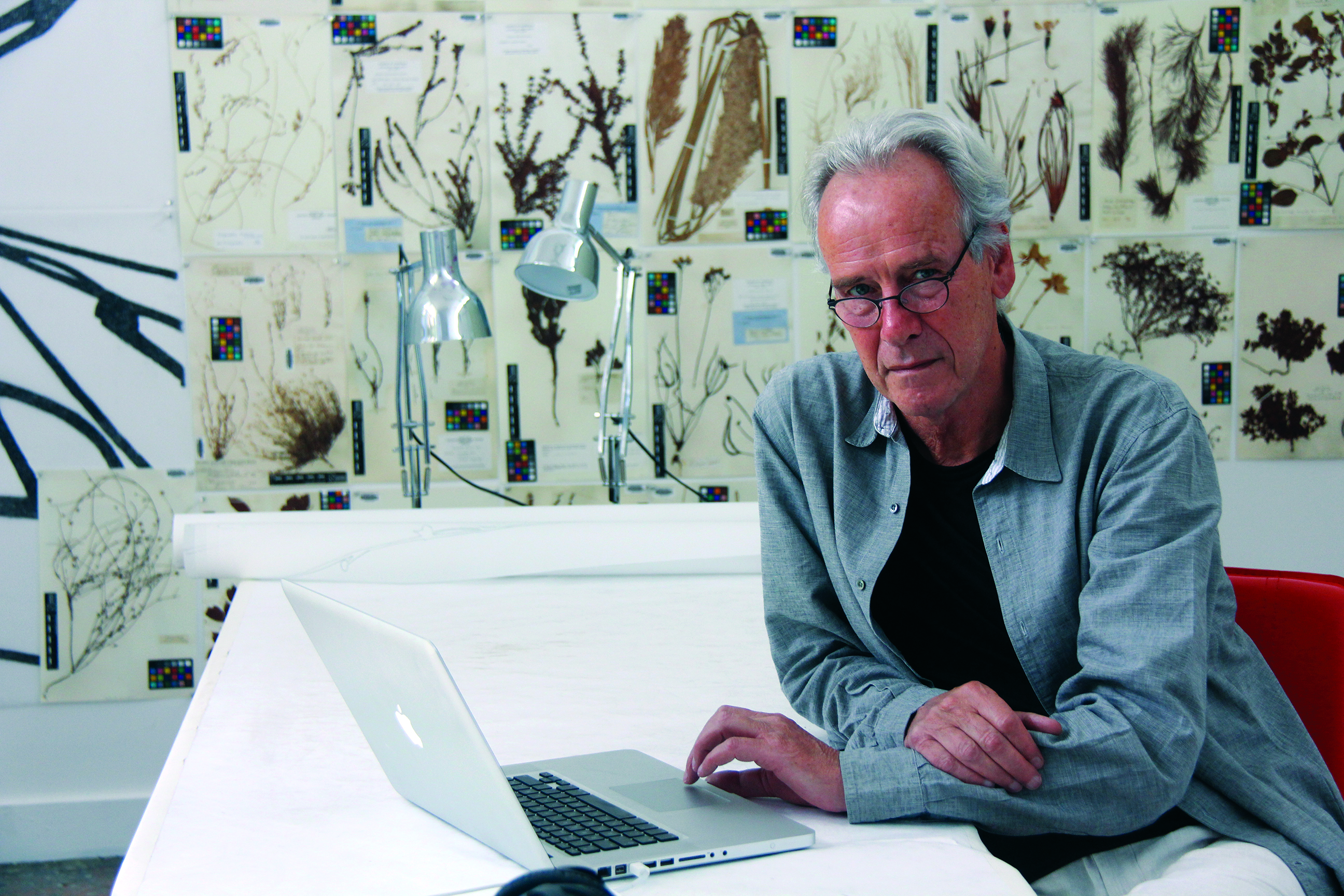
Jan Hendrix, 2011

Kiosko or Refugio is a sculpture by Dutch artist Jan Hendrix, installed in the Zócalo, the main square of Puebla, Puebla, Mexico, on 20 July 2009. It was commissioned by the Fundación Amparo to honour Ángeles Espinosa Yglesias, a philanthropist from the state.

The sculpture features two cylindrical aluminium bodies cut out and baked with white ceramic paint. It is 6 metres (20 ft) high, 4.8 metres (16 ft) wide and 4.8 metres (16 ft) deep. The cylinders feature tree-like cut-outs that create a transparency effect, making elements behind the artwork visible. Kiosko is a contemporary artwork inspired by the gazebo created by Eduardo Tamariz Almendaro in 1883, emulating its circular base and intricate filigree ornamentation.

== Reception ==
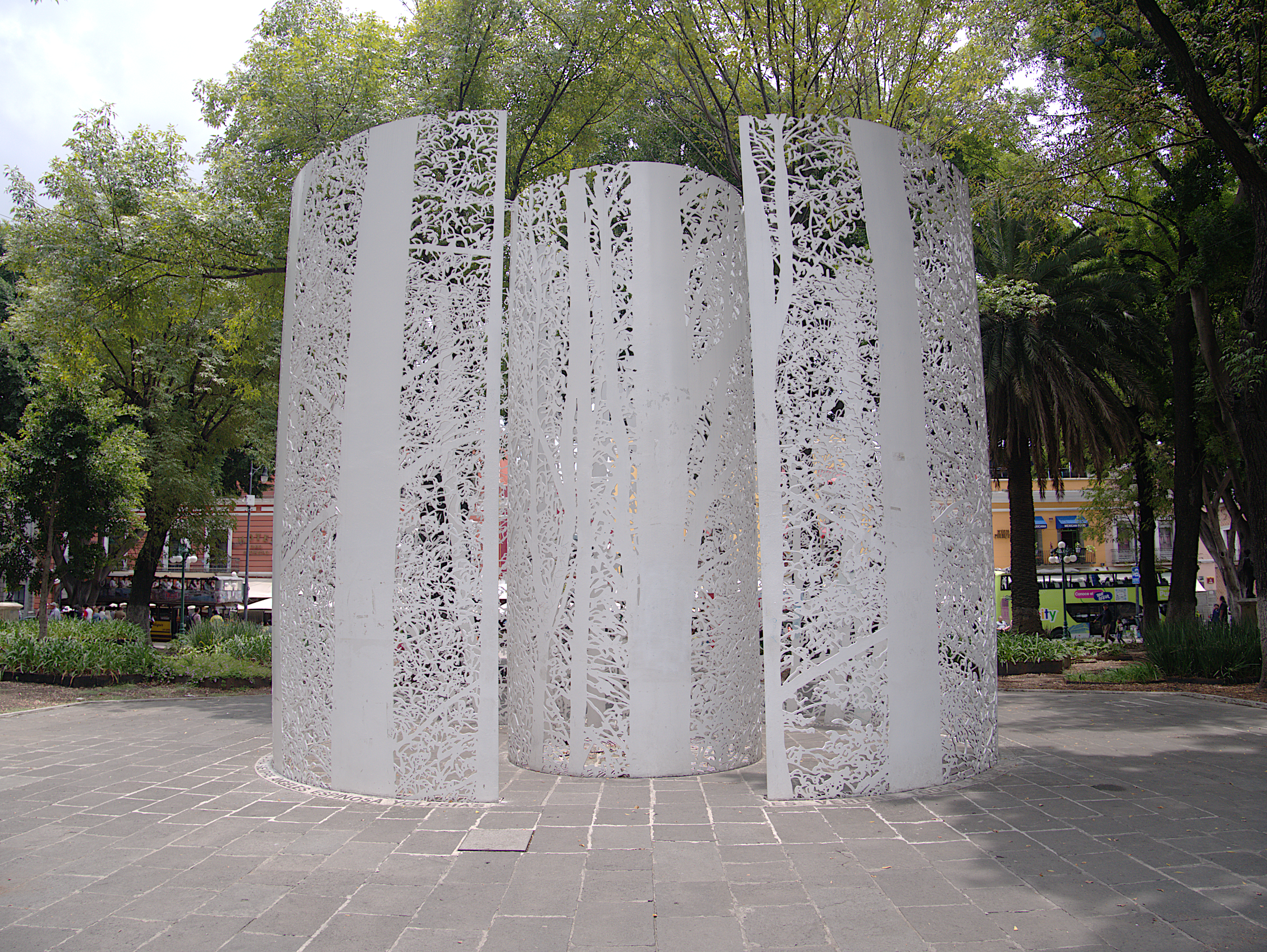
The Kiosko sculpture at Lahaina Noon

For Jose Maria Wilford, Kiosko starts with integration into its green and brown surroundings, highlighted by its white ceramic-coated metal. He considers that while it resembles trees, it also reflects local lace-making inspiration. In his opinion, the outer cylinder features openings that interact with the inner cylinder, creating a dynamic interplay of light and shadow. He adds that the inner cylinder remains enigmatic and accessible only through imagination and a spiritual experience.

For Pedro Ángel Palou García, Hendrix transformed the concept of gazebos by designing one that distorts and fragments reality. He commented that instead of being transparent, the walls of the artwork filter the view of the surrounding jungle. He emphasised it depicts the temporality and compared it to the Möbius strip or an infinity symbol where past and future converge in the perpetual present. In the book Jan Hendrix: Landfall (2019), published by the Museo Universitario Arte Contemporáneo, Cuauhtémoc Medina wrote that in works like Kiosko, "Hendrix's open-air interventions exude the utopia of [modernity] reconciled with an imaginary greenery".

Elvia de la Barquera wrote for La Jornada de Oriente that the artwork differs from other contemporary artworks installed in the historic centre of Puebla, because it is not a bust of a historic person and it is not a bureaucratic project. For her, the sculpture takes the foliage as the main figure in a city where trees are indiscriminately felled or damaged. In 2011, Iván Ruiz wrote for the same newspaper that the artwork is a disruptive part of the landscape, noting that its modern design and stark, monochrome look stand out against the city's vibrant colours. Ruiz lamented that two years after its installation, the sculpture seems to have gone unnoticed by residents and local media, making it appear that contemporary art is trivialised.

There have been intentions to remove the sculpture but these have not materialised.
