= Museo de Arte Contemporáneo de Monterrey =

Museo de Arte Contemporáneo de Monterrey Museum of Contemporary Art, Monterrey
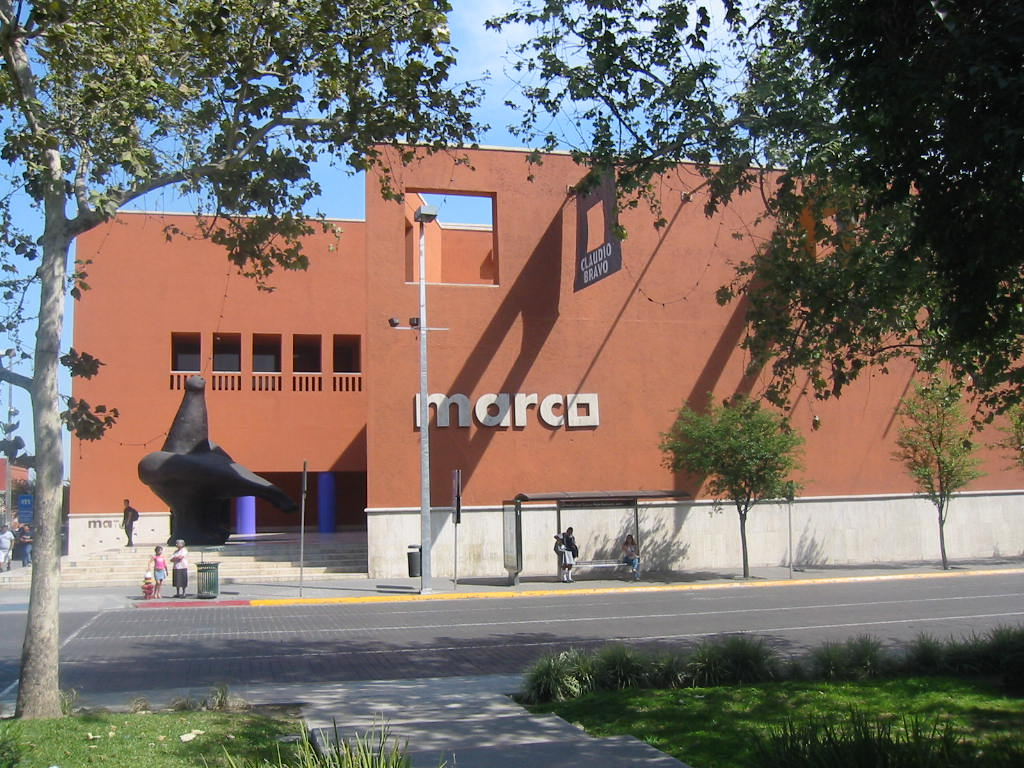
- Established: 1991
- Location: Zuazua and Jardón, Barrio Centro; Monterrey, Nuevo León, México
- Coordinates: 25.669°N 100.310°W
- Type: Contemporary Art museum
- Public transit access: Metro, Zaragoza
- Website: www.marco.org.mx

Museo de Arte Contemporáneo de Monterrey (English: Museum of Contemporary Art, Monterrey), abbreviated as MARCO, is a major contemporary art museum, located in the city of Monterrey, in Nuevo León state of northeastern Mexico.

MARCO organizes major exhibitions with regional and international contemporary artists. The museum is in the Centro district of Monterrey, adjacent to the Macroplaza and to the Barrio Antiguo district.

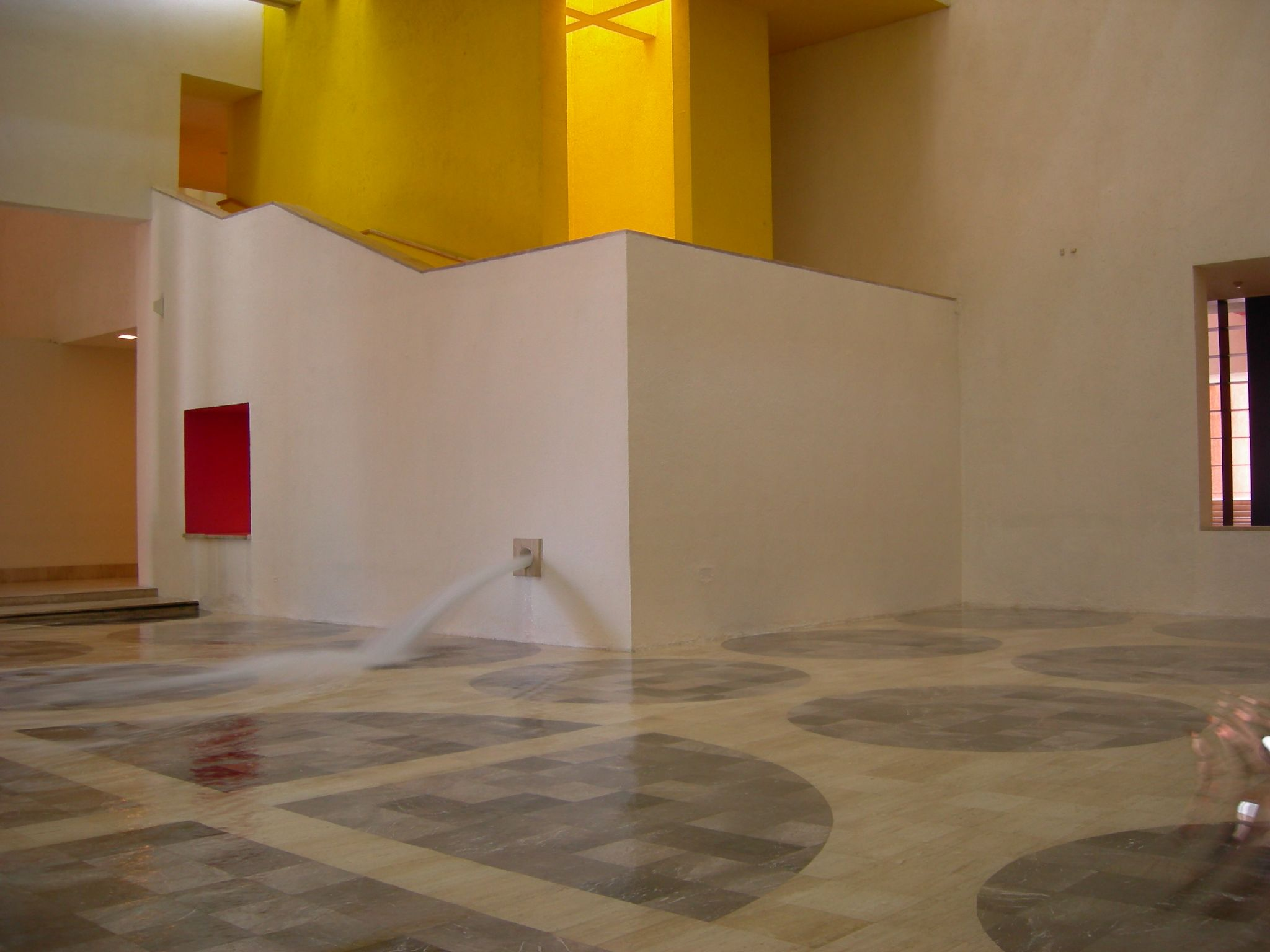
Central Patio with water mirror fountain.

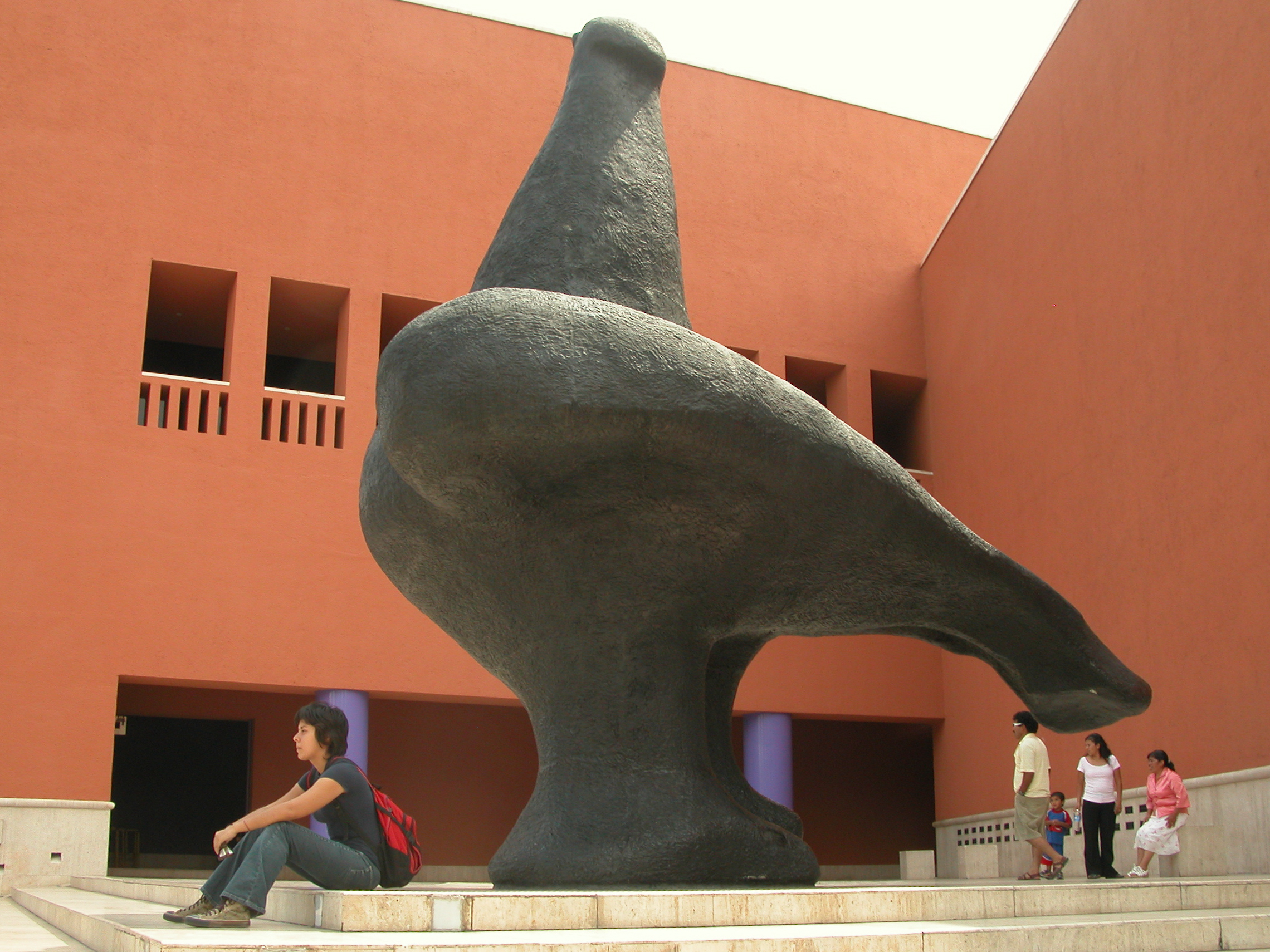
"La Paloma" by sculptor Juan Soriano.

== Architecture ==
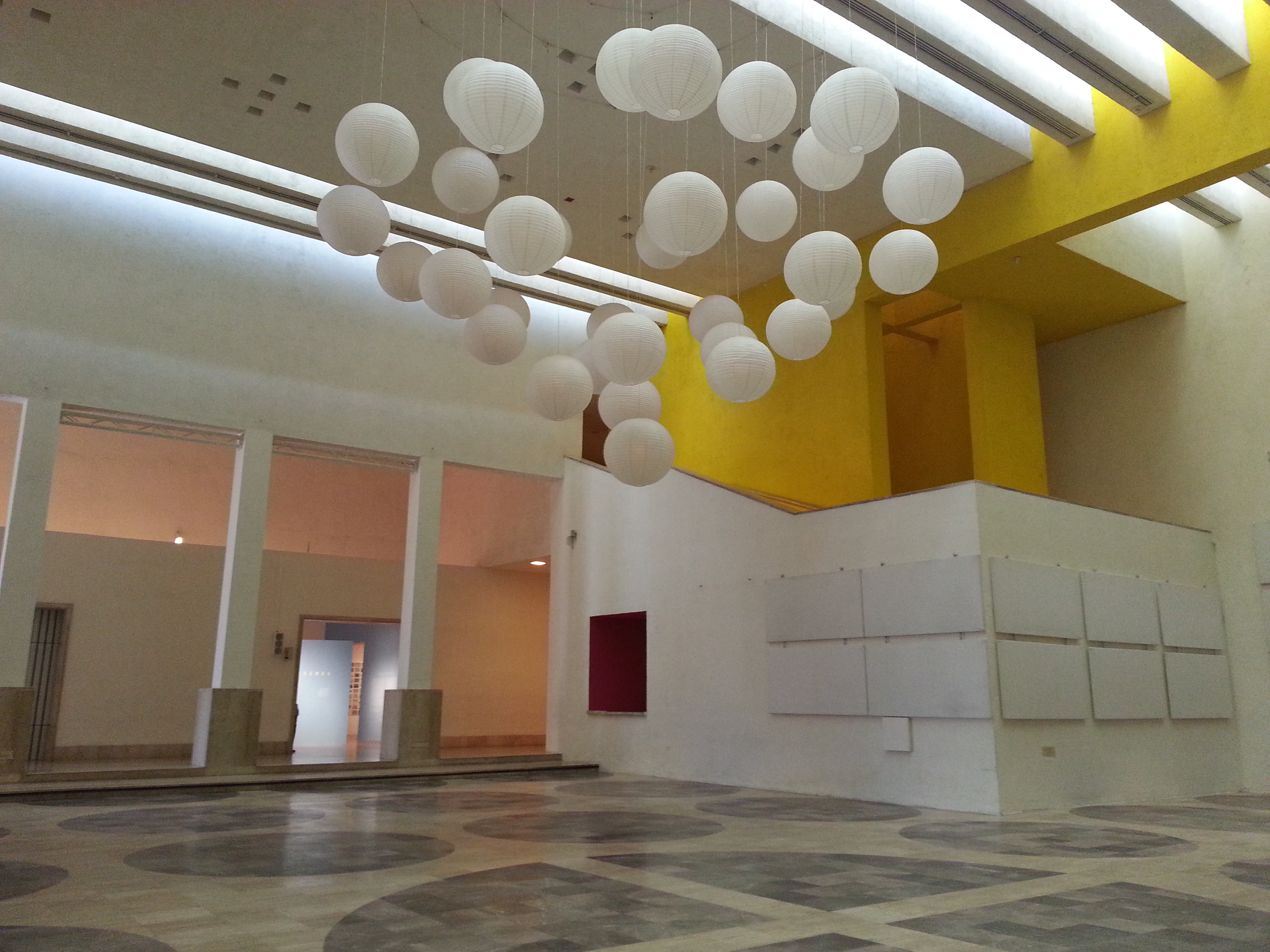
MARCO, interior.

MARCO was designed by Mexican architect Ricardo Legorreta, in a Minimalist Post-modern architectural style. The museum building opened in 1991.

The artworks are in spaces with balanced arrangements of natural and artificial light.

The museum occupies a 16,000-square-metre (170,000 sq ft) structure, with 5,000 square metres (54,000 sq ft) for exhibitions in 11 gallery halls. There is an outdoor sculpture garden courtyard, the Central Patio courtyard with a water mirror fountain, and an auditorium, gift shop and restaurant.

A large outdoor bronze sculpture is a landmark at the museum's entrance plaza on the street. It is an abstracted dove, titled "La Paloma" (the dove), by sculptor Juan Soriano. The 4 ton modern sculpture rises 18 feet (5.5 m) above the plaza and street corner of Zuazua and Jardón streets.

== Artworks ==
=== Permanent collection ===
The permanent collection of the museum is composed of paintings, sculptures, installations, and graphic artworks.

The collection is primarily contemporary Latin American artworks, by Mexican and Latin American artists. There are also works by artists in Europe, the United States, and Canada in the permanent collection.

=== Exhibitions ===
Many Mexican artists have been exhibited in temporary shows at MARCO, including Frida Kahlo, Mathias Goeritz, Gabriel Orozco, Manuel Álvarez Bravo, Armando Salas Portugal, Julio Galán, Teodoro González de León, Enrique Guzmán, Ricardo Mazal, Ricardo Legorreta, Miriam Medrez, Rodolfo Morales, Paula Santiago, Alberto Vargas, and Hermenegildo Bustos.

Other nationalities of artists have also been exhibited in temporary shows, including Isamu Noguchi, Joseph Beuys, Jenny Holzer, Joan Brossa, Ana Mendieta, Paula Rego, Cory Hanson, Henry Moore, Antony Gormley, Jan Hendrix, Michael Ray-Von, Annette Messager, Ron Mueck, Ernesto Neto, and Claudio Bravo.

== #MuseoDeTodos ==
In 2019 MARCO launched its #MuseoDeTodos marketing campaign, inviting people from all walks of life to visit the museum and enjoy the art in exhibition; The campaign was awarded an A! design award for their advertisement design.

== See also ==
- Art museums in Mexico
- Contemporary art galleries in Mexico
- Landmarks in Monterrey
