= Centro Cultural Bella Época =

Coordinates: 19.407530°N 99.177560°W

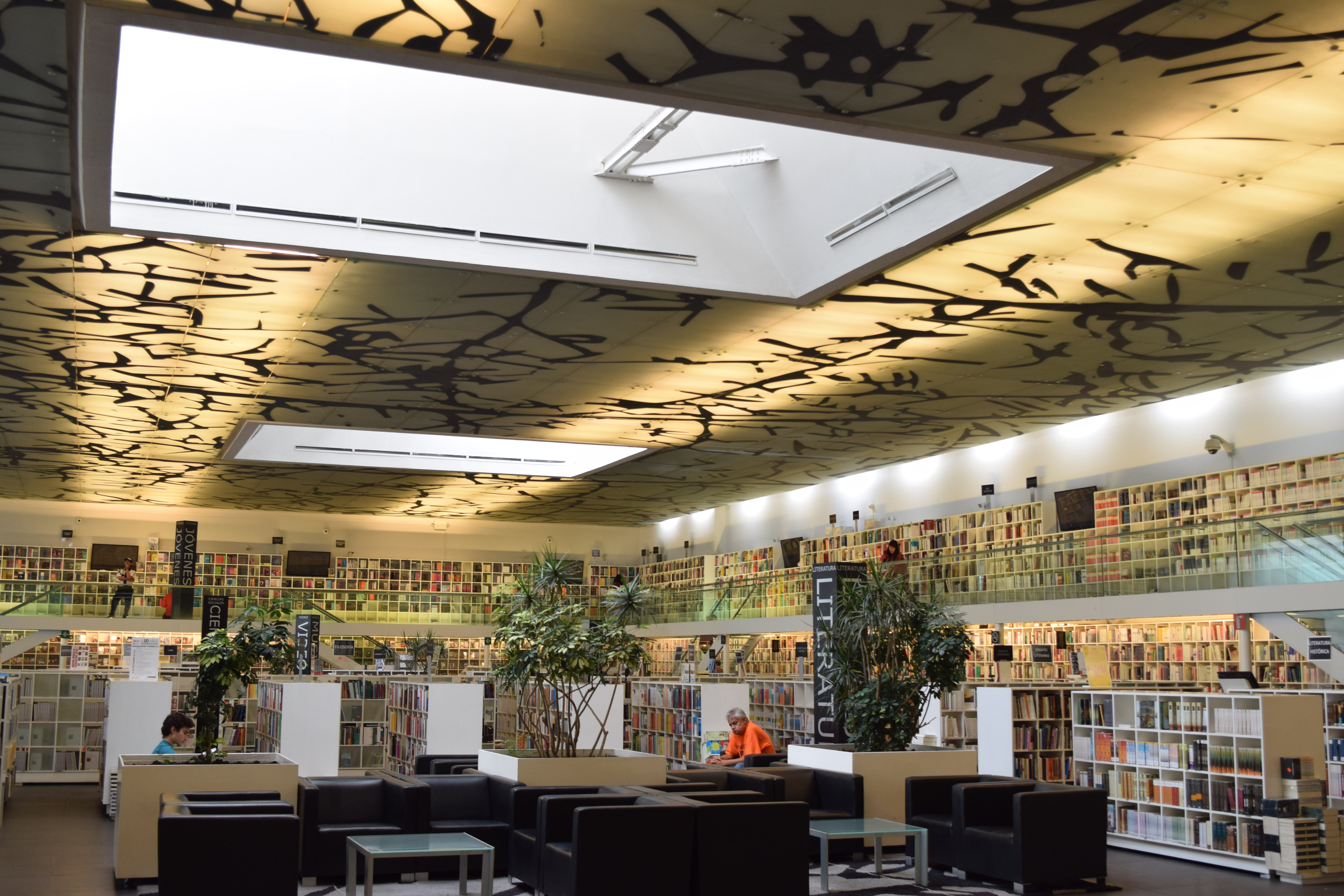
Centro Cultural Bella Época (Beautiful Time Cultural Center), book store located at Colonia Condesa, Mexico City.

The Centro Cultural Bella Epoca is a cultural 3,000 square meter cultural centre in the Condesa neighborhood in Mexico City. It includes the Rosario Castellanos bookshop (claimed to be the largest bookshop in Latin America) which carries over 35 thousand different titles, and has a children’s area, a coffee shop, and reading facilities. The Cine Lido art cinema and Galería Luis Cardoza y Aragón art gallery are also housed in the cultural center.

== History ==
The building occupied by the cultural centre began its life as the Cine Lido cinema in 1942. It was designed in Art Deco style by the American architect Charles Lee. At some point the cinema changed its name to Bella Época. In 1999 the city's government acquired the building but was unable to come up with any use for it. Finally in 2003 the government owned Fondo de Cultura Económica bought the building with the intention of turning it into a cultural centre.

== Renewal ==
The renewal project was in charge of Mexican architect Teodoro González de León, who also directed the construction of the Tamayo Contemporary Art Museum and the renewal of the National Auditorium in Mexico City, among other projects. The original Art Deco architecture of the building exterior was preserved.

The 2,000 square meters glass ceiling was designed by Dutch artist Jan Hendrix and it explores natural forms with a simulated Arab writing.
