= Metrorrey Line 2 =

Line 2

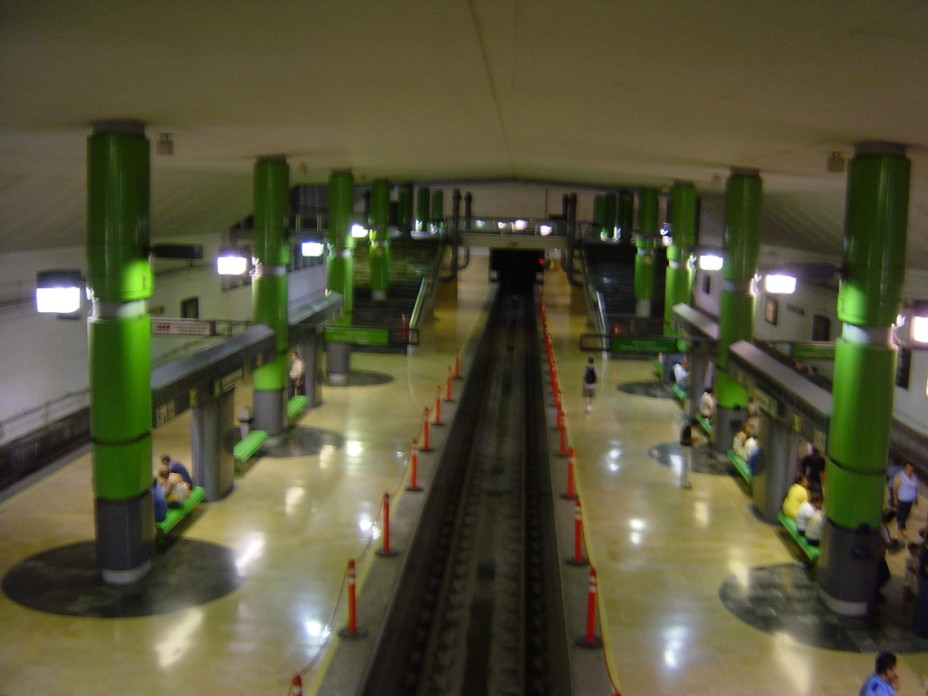
- Interior of the Cuauhtémoc station

Overview
- Status: Operational
- Locale: Monterrey
- Termini: Sendero; Zaragoza
- Stations: 13

Service
- Type: Rapid transit
- System: Metrorrey
- Operator(s): Sistema de Transporte Colectivo Metrorrey

History
- Opened: 30 November 1994; 31 years ago
- Last extension: 2008

Technical
- Line length: 13.036 km (8.100 mi)
- Track length: 13.750 km (8.544 mi)
- Track gauge: 1,435 mm (4 ft 8 1/2 in)

Line 2 is a line on the Metrorrey system. It has 13 stations and it runs 13.036 km (8.100 mi) from Sendero to Zaragoza. The line opened on 30 November 1994.

== History ==
Construction for Line 2 started in February 1993 and was inaugurated on November 30, 1994, in the stretch from General Anaya to Zaragoza. After 14 years, the second stage of the line, from Regina to Universidad, was inaugurated on 31 October 2007, by José Natividad González Parás, Governor of Nuevo León from 2003 to 2009. The last section of Line 2 was inaugurated one year later, on 1 October 2008, form Anáhuac to Sendero, the current northern terminus of the line.

== Chronology ==
- 30 November 1994: from General Anaya to Zaragoza
- 31 October 2007: from Regina to Universidad
- 1 October 2008: from Anáhuac to Sendero

== Stations ==
Station	Opened	Level	Interchanges	Location
Sendero	1 October 2008	Elevated	Transmetro Routes: Apodaca, Monterreal, Fomerrey 9	General Escobedo / San Nicolás de los Garza
Santiago Tapia	1 October 2008	Elevated		San Nicolás de los Garza
San Nicolás	1 October 2008	Elevated	Transmetro Routes: Las Puentes, Santo Domingo	San Nicolás de los Garza
Anáhuac	1 October 2008	Elevated		San Nicolás de los Garza
Universidad	31 October 2007	Elevated		San Nicolás de los Garza
Niños Héroes	31 October 2007	Elevated		Monterrey
Regina	31 October 2007	Underground	Ecovía	Monterrey
General Anaya	30 November 1994	Underground		Monterrey
Cuauhtémoc	30 November 1994	Underground	Monterrey's Metrorrey metro system Metrorrey Line 1	Monterrey
Alameda	30 November 1994	Underground		Monterrey
Fundadores	30 November 1994	Underground		Monterrey
Padre Mier	30 November 1994	Underground		Monterrey
Zaragoza	30 November 1994	Underground	Monterrey's Metrorrey metro system Metrorrey Line 3	Monterrey
