= Bernardo Gómez-Pimienta =

Mexican architect (born 1961)

Bernardo Gómez-Pimienta (born August 18, 1961) is a Mexican architect and furniture designer.

His projects include the National Theatre School-CNA, the Hotel Habita, the renovation of Teatro de los Insurgentes, the Building Services Televisa in Chapultepec, and the sports complex JVC Educare in Guadalajara, Jalisco.

== Biography ==
Gómez-Pimienta was born in Belgium and has been an architect since 1987. He is the director of the School of Architecture at the Universidad Anahuac del Norte and a member of the National Academy of Architecture and of the National System of Creators of CONACULTA.

He was the founding partner and co-director of TEN Arquitectos from 1987–2003; in 2003, he became the principal of BGP Arquitectura.

== Awards and recognitions ==
Gómez-Pimienta has been decorated as a Knight of the Legion of Honor by the French Republic, appointed Honorary Member of the AIA, HonFAIA (American Institute of Architects), and is an Honorary Member of the RAIC. He was awarded the first Mies Van der Rohe Latin America award in 1998.

In 2008, the American Institute of Architects named Gómez-Pimienta as an Honorary Fellow, alongside 13 other architects from around the globe.
