= Josué & Trópico Suemba =

Josué Pérez
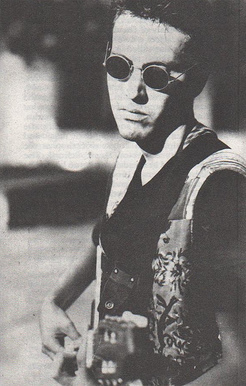
- Josué (Hacienda Buenaventura, Puerto Vallarta, Mexico) in 1993

Background information
- Born: Josué Ignacio Pérez Flores; September 16, 1969 (age 56)
- Origin: Mexico City, Mexico
- Genres: NeoSon, Música popular brasileira, tropicalismo, Pop, psychedelic rock
- Occupations: Singer-songwriter, musician, writer
- Instruments: Voice, acoustic guitar
- Years active: 1986–present
- Website: http://www.suemba.mex.tl

Trópico Suemba is a musical project created by Josué whose collaborators include several members of Mexico's most talented songwriters and performers. It is one of the chief exponents of the emerging movement NeoSon.

== Josué ==
Josué Ignacio Pérez Flores was born in Mexico City in 1969 and spent there part of his early childhood. At four, he moved to the pacific coast (Manzanillo, Colima). His first musical influences were his father, and avid music-lover, and the local rhythms such as Cumbia and Bolero. At eleven, he moved to Chicago to pursue his education. There he was exposed to Blues, Jazz, and American pop music. In 1984 he arrived in Guadalajara to attend High School and in 1987 he enrolled the University of Guadalajara to study music. In 1988 he joined the group Xel-ha, with which he had great acclaim in the late 1980s in Peña Cuicacalli, a famous place in the music scene in Guadalajara. They also performed in the Degollado Theatre, the most important theatre in the city. In 1990 he, along with his friend Carlos García, travelled extensively throughout almost all countries in Latin America looking for musical and artistic inspiration. In 1993 he came back to Guadalajara and recorded his LP Sobre la América Morena, which included collected material from the trip. 1995 he studied under renowned Jazz musician Mario Romero. In 1997 he studied music therapy under Argentine teacher Mariela Pietragala. In August 1999 he went to Cuba to present his show Vivo o Muerto. In 2001 he recorded his ground-breaking album NeoSon Vol. 1, in which the idea of NeoSon was already latent and mature. After some years out of the music scene, he returned in 2007 with the LP Como Una Onda de Mar which included his best Brazilian hits.

== Trópico Suemba and NeoSon ==
Musical movements in Mexico since the beginning of the 20th century have been the source of inspiration for many generations of Latin American musicians but in the last decades the lack of openness and collaborative attitude within the country's artistic world has led many talented people to, either ignore their roots by embracing foreign influences, or, conversely, ignore foreign influences by sticking to a nationalistic approach. Trópico Suemba, by contrast, has proposed a new musical framework. Taking as a model Brazil's antropofagia that flourished in the first decades of the last century Josué started to experiment with a wide spectrum of musical material. His first compositions draw mainly on Bossa nova and Bolero and gradually incorporated jazz and European rhythms until he consolidated the approach for which he is best known: the NeoSon.

== Discography ==
Studio albums

- Xel-ha with the band Xel-ha (1988)
- Mosaico (Recorded in Brazil), (1991)
- Sobre La América Morena (1993)
- NeoSon Vol. 1(2000)
- Como Una Onda de Mar (2007)

Live albums

- Vivo o Muerto (2004)

== Documentaries ==
- Sobre La América Morena (1993)
