= Brenda Velez =

Mexican ballerina and architect (born 1979)

Brenda Vélez
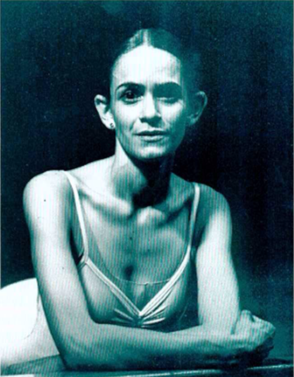
- Brenda Vélez at Age 22
- Born: Brenda Minerva Vélez González; March 20, 1979 (age 46); Guadalajara, Jalisco, Mexico
- Education: ITESO, Tec de Monterrey
- Occupation(s): Ballerina, Architect
- Years active: 1988-present
- Spouse: Oscar Rodrigo (m. 2003)
- Children: 4

Brenda Vélez (born March 23, 1979) is a Mexican ballerina and architect. She is best known for performing in Swan Lake and in Giselle in Guadalajara's Teatro Degollado and owning VIA DANZA a dance academy in Guadalajara.

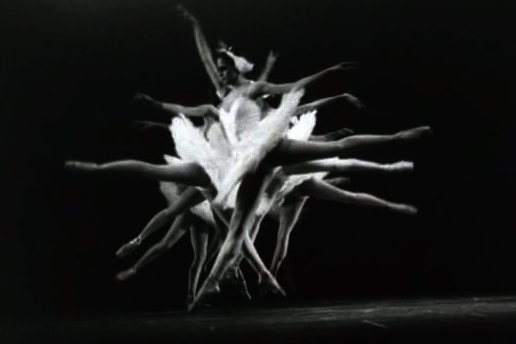
Brenda Velez in the production of Swan Lake

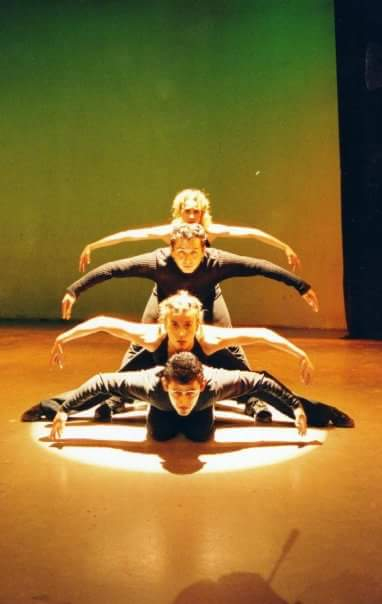
Brenda Velez at Teatro Degollado training for a performance

== Early life and career beginnings ==
Brenda Velez was born in Guadalajara, Jalisco. At age 6 her parents brought her to an orthopedic doctor because of their daughter's feet. Brenda was flat footed having no arches on her feet. The doctor recommended her to take ballet classes. At age 8 Brenda began ballet in a local school in Guadalajara called Victoria Ballet Guadalajara. She commented that "At first it was for medical reasons then I learned to love it." At age 12 Brenda left for Mexico City to take a few ballet classes. She commented that "When I attended my first class at the school the teacher commented how late I started ballet and told me I should just have become a model." Brenda was taught by many teachers that were recognized in the state of Jalisco such as Carmen Sandoval, Carmen Pardon, Segui, Vicencio, Guillermo Hernandez, Ricardo Costo and Alejandro Zybin. During her dancing career she studied architecture in ITESO. In 1998 she worked in two dance academies, Escuela de Danza Club Deportivo Guadalajara and Escuela de Danza Club LAS Fuentes. In 2001 she competed in Monterrey, Nuevo Leon during the American Dance Competition and won first place as a soloist. At age 21 in 2004, pregnant with her first child, she had her debut and was offered a scholarship from the Secretary of Culture in Jalisco. She was Myrthe in Giselle in a state production at the Teatro Degollado and was in the production of Swan Lake months later.

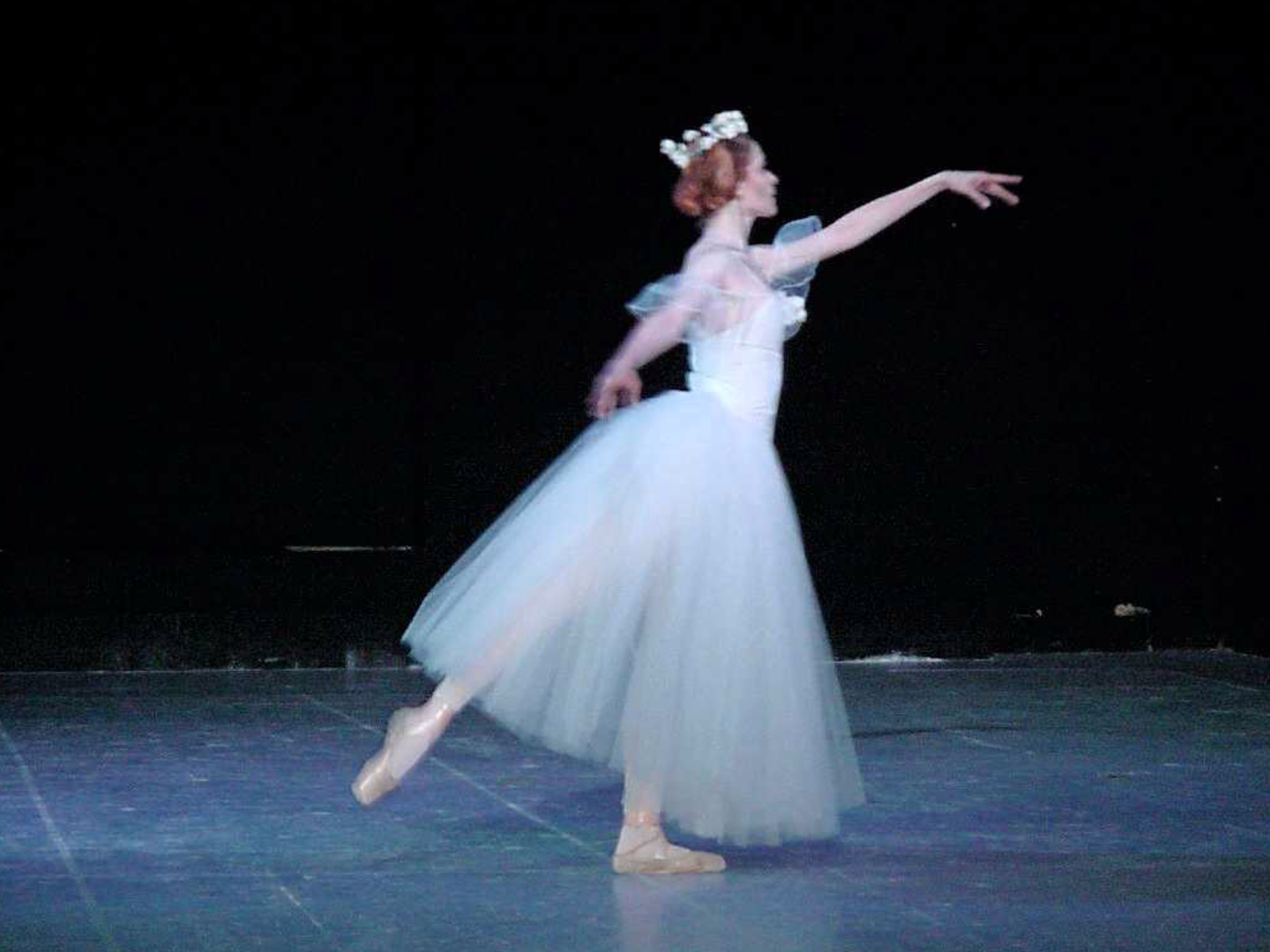
Picture of Brenda Velez in the production of Giselle

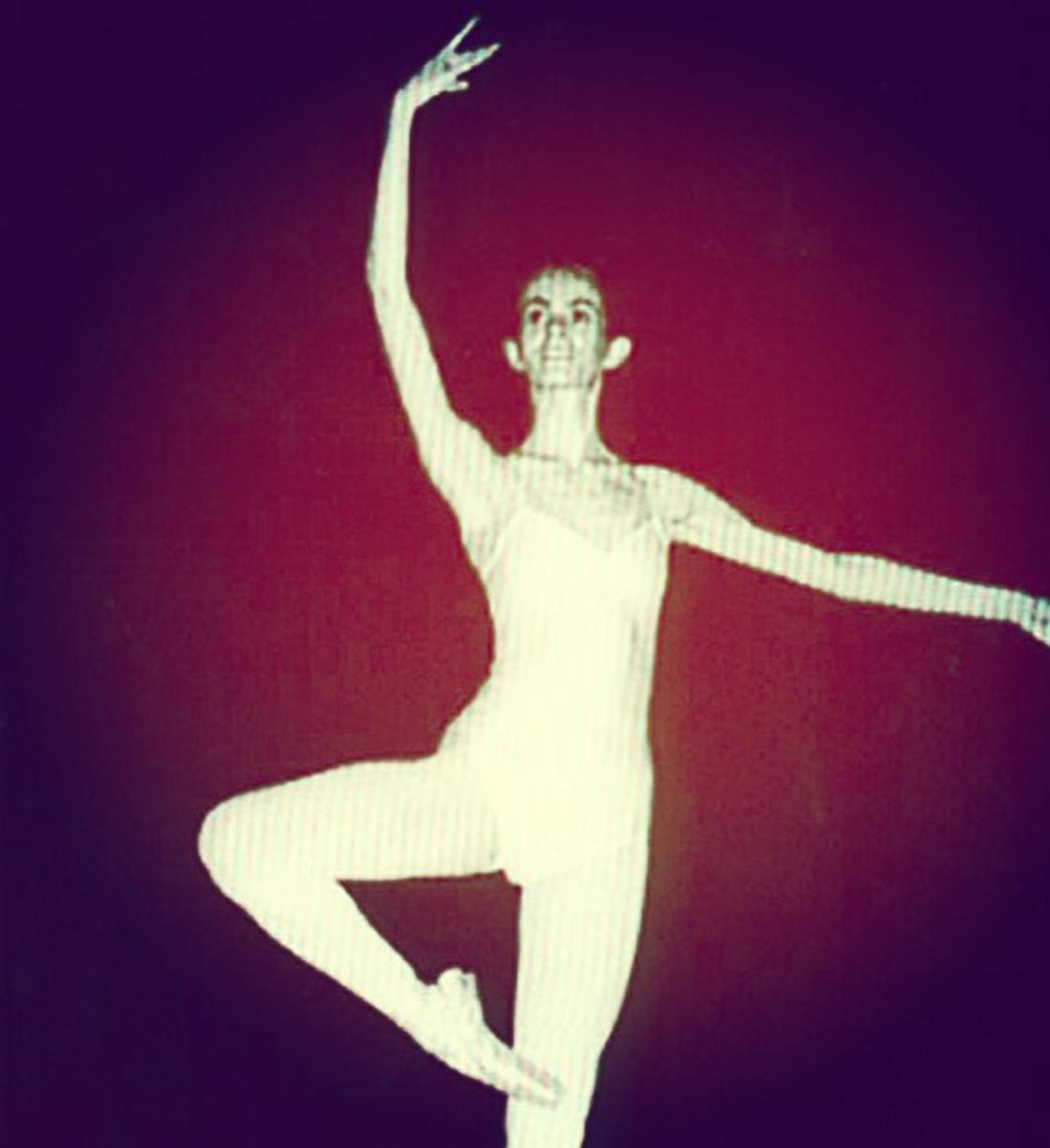
Brenda Velez in photo shoot at Teatro Degollado

== Personal life ==
In 2003 she married Óscar Rodríguez. She has four children: Erick, Sofía, Sara and Dante. She continues to dance while opening a dance academy with Xochilt Ayala and Paloma Ramírez in January 2015, named VIA DANZA.
