= General Anaya metro station (Monterrey) =

Monterrey metro station

General Anaya
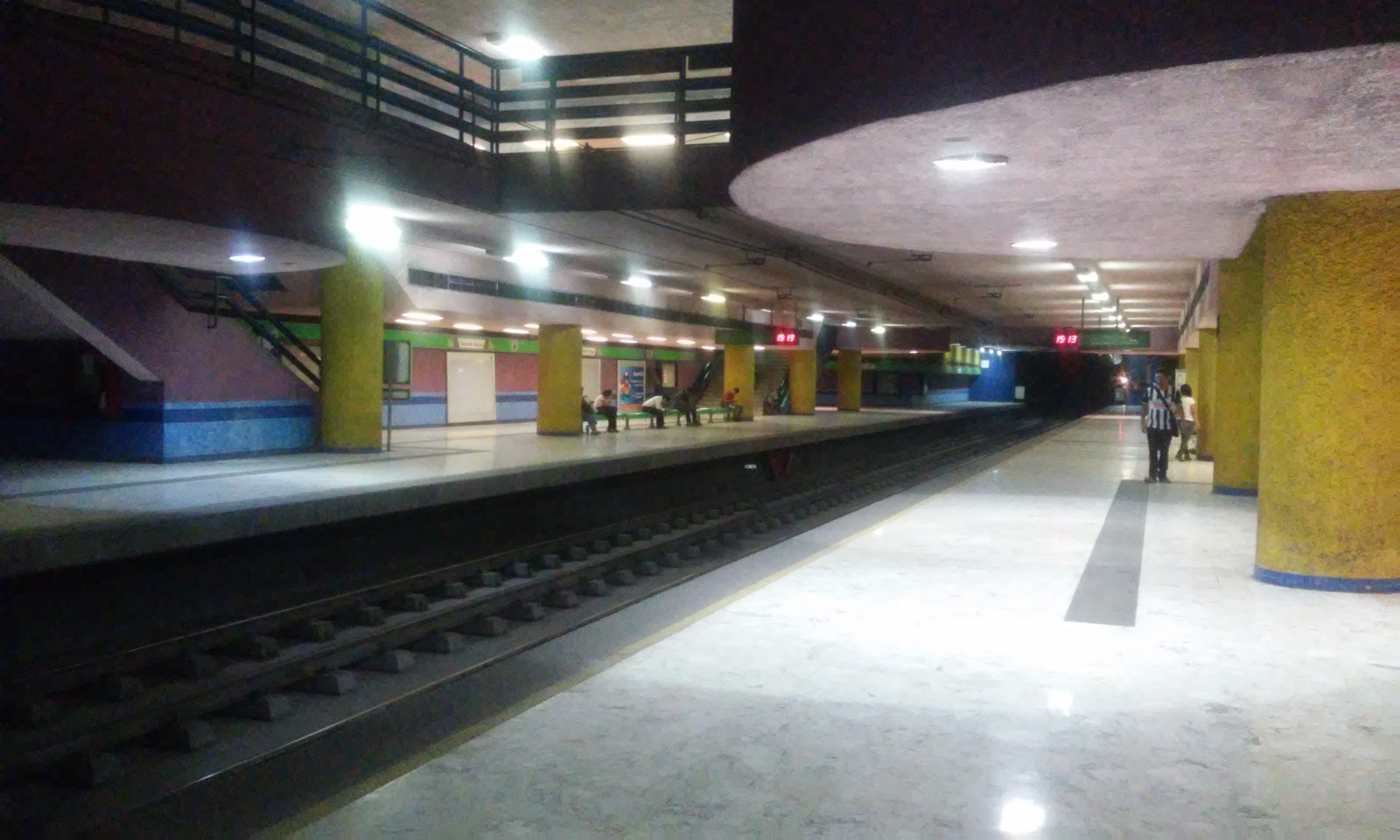

General information
- Location: Monterrey; Nuevo León, Mexico
- Coordinates: 25°41′49″N 100°19′00″W
- Operator: STC Metrorrey

History
- Opened: 30 November 1994

Services
Preceding station	Metrorrey	Following station
Regina toward Sendero	Line 2	Cuauhtémoc toward General I. Zaragoza
Location

The General Anaya station (Spanish: Estación General Anaya) is a station on the Monterrey Metro. The station was opened on 30 November 1994 as the northern terminus of the inaugural section of Line 2, between General Anaya and Zaragoza. On 31 October 2007, the line was extended north to Universidad. General Anaya is an underground station located on Avenida Alfonso Reyes in the city of Monterrey.

The General Anaya station is located nearby the FEMSA headquarters building and just a few steps from the Cervecería Cuauhtémoc Moctezuma.

== See also ==
- List of Monterrey metro stations
