= NeoSon =

Mexican artistic movement

NeoSon is an artistic movement developed in Guadalajara, Mexico, by a group of local artists, Josué Pérez being its main exponent. The movement was started in the early 1990s after a two-year tour by Pérez and Carlos "Charly" Garcia (one of the best multi-instrumentalists in the country) through 13 countries in Latin America, especially Brazil. The genesis was prompted by Pérez's perception of the lack of artistic innovation in Mexico experienced from the 1960s on. Although Mexican art has always had plenty of creative minds and people interested in its promotion, a considerable gap separated the country's artistic scene from those of other countries such as Brazil and Argentina. This separation was particularly felt after the concert of Avándaro (regarded as the Mexican Woodstock) in 1971, after which rock music in the country was object of repressions by the government, the media and the conservative part of Mexican society, until approximately 1984. The repression caused a collapse in the young musicians' (and artists in general) creative and social objectives.

== See also ==
- Josué & Trópico Suemba
