= Scott Neri =

Mexican painter, illustrator, designer and short fiction writer

- Born: Guadalajara, Mexico
- Education: University of Guadalajara
- Known for: Painting, Design, Illustration
- Movement: Digital Art, Surrealism

Scott Neri (born 1972 in Guadalajara, Jalisco) is a Mexican painter, illustrator, designer and short fiction writer. He was the founding member and director of the Guadalajara-based online community for artists Tomarte, and art director of EterUltra Studios.

== Artistic development ==
Scott Neri was born in Guadalajara in 1972. He studied Visual Arts at the University of Guadalajara from 1987 to 1991, screenwriting at Centro de Actores y Autores de Occidente under the mentorship of Oscar Trejo, and Cinema at the Centro de Arte Audiovisual. His first individual exhibition, named M Impresionismo Bizarro (M Bizarre Impressionism) was held in 1992. He has taken part in several collective exhibitions in New York City, Madrid and Guadalajara. He has attended workshops with renowned Mexican writers José Agustín and Juan José Arreola. Neri has described his artwork as a personal incursion into pop surrealism and imaginism.

== Exhibitions ==
- 2002 - Personal Sin Quotes - Galería Arte Estudio - Individual, M Impresionismo Bizarro - Les Fleurs du Mort, Centro de Arte Audio Visual, GDL - Individual
- 2003 - Guadalajara en un Llano - Tomarte en Vigo, Spain - Collective, Exhibition of Mexican Art - Tomarte en Madrid, Spain - Collective, Obscure Journeys I - Jorge Martínez Gallery, GDL - Collective, Revolucionarte - Tomarte, Zapopan, Jalisco - Collective, Cinema Roxy Bar - GDL - Collective, Casa Arcos - GDL - Collective
- 2004 - La Quema del Diablo - Casa Arcos, GDL - Collective, Puppet - La Santa Bar, GDL - Individual, Festival de las Nuevas Artes - Expo GDL - Collective, Latex - Museo de la Ciudad, Saltillo - Collective, Obscure Journeys II - Casa Vieja, GDL - Collective, 30th Anniversary of Radio UdeG - GDL - Collective, Blood of Cain - Les Fleurs du Mort, Bar Galería, Foro de Arte y Cultura, Swinger Bar Gallery, GDL - Individual, Cuerpo Presente - Museo de la Ciudad, Saltillo - Collective, Under the Skin - La Comuna Taller Galería, GDL - Collective
- 2005 - A Lubrik Vision - Bolko Bar Gallery, GDL - Collective of erotic art, Se Busca Coleccionista Novel - Humo Gallery, GDL - Collective, I want to see Blood - Ex-Convento del Carmen, GDL - Collective, Sinner - Jadite Gallery, New York City - Collective, X - Cunorte UdeG, Colotlán, Redibú Bar, Ajolote Gallery, GDL - Individual, Expo Santa Fe - Santo Coyote, GDL - Collective, La Mata Tinta, GDL - Collective, Permanent Sephirot - Opio Club, GDL - Individual

== Short fiction ==
- Ritos, 1997
- Extrañas Entrañas, 1998
