= Lewis Kant =

Argentine-born Mexican artist and writer (born 1952)

Lewis Kant (born 1952 in Buenos Aires) is an Argentine-born Mexican artist and writer who has lived most of his life in Guadalajara, Jalisco. Lewis Kant-Roterman Kant from an early age devoted himself to modeling and painting, obtaining in 1967, at the age of fifteen, the prestigious S.H.A. of Sculpture in his native Buenos Aires, where he was born on January 27, 1952. In the 1960s and 1970s, he carried out large Installations and Art Experiments, common in the searches of that time. Nationalized Mexican in 1996 and as such he is artistically known today. He lives and produces his work in Guadalajara, Jalisco, Mexico. Self-taught, he currently works on sculpture in small and medium formats, both in fine woods and in bronze, silver and obsidian. His paintings are based on abstract-expressionist concepts with subtle lighting and a careful personal and unmistakable technique. He has resided and worked his art in Argentina, Brazil, Israel, Mexico, Switzerland and the U.S.A. Awarded in 2006 with the National Silver Award “Hugo Salinas Price”. His work has been displayed at galleries in Mexico, Europe and North America.
