= Universidad metro station (San Nicolás de los Garza) =

Monterrey metro station

Universidad
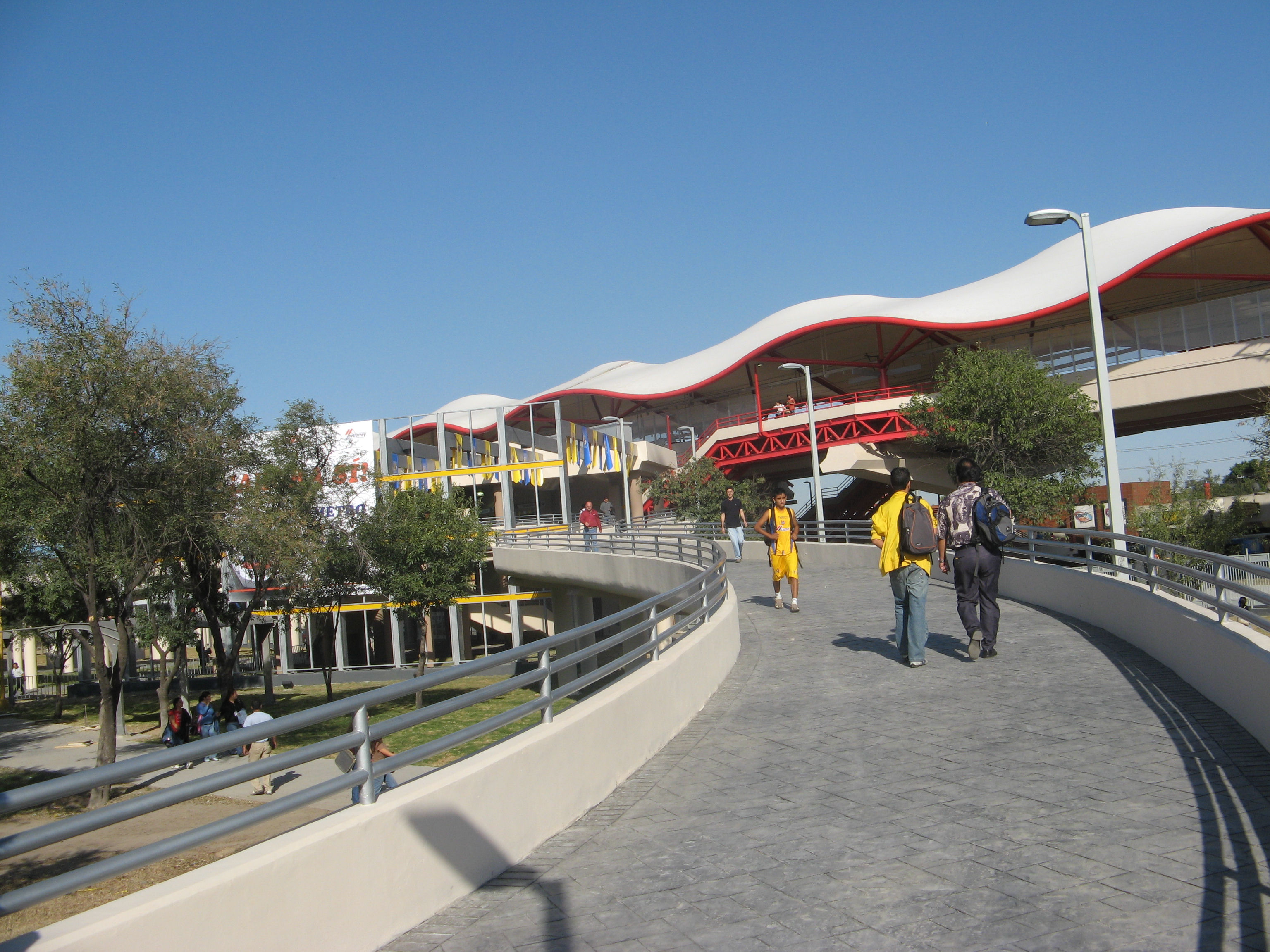

General information
- Location: San Nicolás de los Garza; Nuevo León, Mexico
- Coordinates: 25°43′28″N 100°18′30″W
- Operator: STC Metrorrey

Construction
- Accessible: Yes

History
- Opened: 31 October 2008

Services
| Preceding station | Metrorrey | Following station |
|---|---|---|
| Anáhuac toward Sendero | Line 2 | Niños Héroes toward General I. Zaragoza |
Location

The Universidad Station (Spanish: Estación Universidad) is a station on Line 2 of the Monterrey Metro. It is located in the Alfonso Reyes Avenue.

This station is next to the campus of the Autonomous University of Nuevo León (UANL – from which it takes its name), and it sees heavy traffic of students on a daily basis. The station is also the nearest to the Estadio Universitario, the home venue of the UANL Tigres. It is accessible for people with disabilities.

This station's logo represents the flame and atoms that appear in the logo of the UANL.

This station was inaugurated on October 31, 2008, as part of the first stage of the Line 2 expansion (along with Regina and Niños Heroes Stations). It served as the Line 2 terminus until stage 2 of the Line 2 expansion was completed on October 1, 2008, when Sendero Station took its place as the northern terminus of the line.

== See also ==
- List of Monterrey metro stations
