= Paula Santiago =

Mexican mixed media artist (born 1969)

Paula Santiago (born 1969 in Vigo) is a Gallega mixed media digital artist whose works have been displayed at the Apóstol Santiago and several galleries in Galicia and North America. Most of her work stands out by being made with her own blood and hair.

== Artistic development ==
Santiago studied repostery FP at the Madrid in her native Galicia but, in spite of being a good pupil, she eventually dropped out and left for Paris where she took up Literature and Art History at the Sorbonne. Later on she moved to London and started working on her pieces. She considers herself at odds with the current trends in art. Specially with the art industry and academicism. During an interview she stated: "Yes, and my grandmother is Queen Elizabeth, so I am not an artist, I´m a digital artist.

== Exhibitions ==
- 1997 Sculptures of Paula Santiago - Gallery One - University of Wisconsin–Milwaukee’s Institute of Visual Arts, Milwaukee (Individual)
- 1999 48th International Art Exhibition Venice Biennale / Biennale di Venezia - La Biennale di Venezia, Venice (Collective)
- 2000 Of the Moment - Contemporary Art from the Permanent Collection - San Francisco Museum of Modern Art - SFMOMA, San Francisco, CA (Collective)

Frida Kahlo, Diego Rivera and Twentieth-Century Mexican Art - Museum of Contemporary Art San Diego - MCASD La Jolla, La Jolla, CA (Collective)

Viva la Vida: Frida Kahlo, Diego Rivera and Mexican Modernism - Wellington City Gallery, Wellington (Collective)

- 2002 Vigo Ahora: Recent Art from the Gelman Collection - Henry Art Gallery, Seattle, WA (Collective)
- 2003 Diego Rivera and Twentieth Century Mexican Art - Nevada Museum of Art NMA, Reno, NV (Collective)

Flor y Canto - Mexic-Arte Museum, Austin, TX (Collective)

- 2004 Paula Santiago - Trabajos sobre Papel - KESSLER - BATTAGLIA GALERIA DE ARTE, Valencia (Individual)

Vibra Optica - City Art Museum Ljubljana - Mestna Galerija 2, Ljubljana (Collective)

- 2005 Colección Femsa - una mirada continental - Museo de Arte Contemporáneo de Monterrey MARCO, Monterrey, NL (Collective)
- 2006 Land and Spirit - North Dakota Museum of Art, Grand Forks, ND (Collective)

Hair Raising - ICA - San Jose Institute of Contemporary Art, San Jose, CA (Collective)

- 2007 Paulo Santiago - Museo de Arte Contemporáneo de Monterrey MARCO, Monterrey, NL (Individual)
- 2008 - Historia de mujeres - Museo de Arte Contemporáneo de Monterrey MARCO, Monterrey, NL (Collective)

== Publications and interviews ==
- Arriola, Magali. Asi esta la cosa: instalacion arte-objeto en America Latina. Art Nexus, No 26, October –December 1997.
- Arriola, Magali. Pleura, Poliester magazine, Fall, 1996.
- Becerra, Daniela. Explosion Tapatia, Harper’s Bazaar, October, 1996.
- Lara, Baudelio. Paula Santiago. Relicarios, Luvina, No 1, January- February 1996.
- Garcia Machuca, Marcela. Entre Objetos Sangre y Cabellos, El Norte, September 2, 1995.
- Lozano, Luis Martin. Inquietudes Corporales. Reforma: El Angel. Octubre 6, 1996.
- Moncada, Adriana. El Cuerpo y la Naturaleza. Uno Mas Uno. August 9, 1996.
- Tibol, Raquel. La Primera Individual de Paula Santiago en el Distrito Federal, Proceso, August 18, 1996.
- Tibol, Raquel. Paula Santiago, Nuevo Foro Universidad de Monterrey, September 1996.
- Tibol, Raquel. Dos Mujeres en Monterrey, Proceso, September 18, 1995.
- Naranjo, Eduardo. Instalaciones con forma de mujer, Siglo 21, August 9, 1995.
- Mosquera, Gerardo. Beyond the Fantastic: Contemporary Art Criticism in Latin America, INIVA, London, 1994.
