= Museo Amparo =

Museum in Puebla City, Mexico

Coordinates: 19.0408°N 98.1985°W

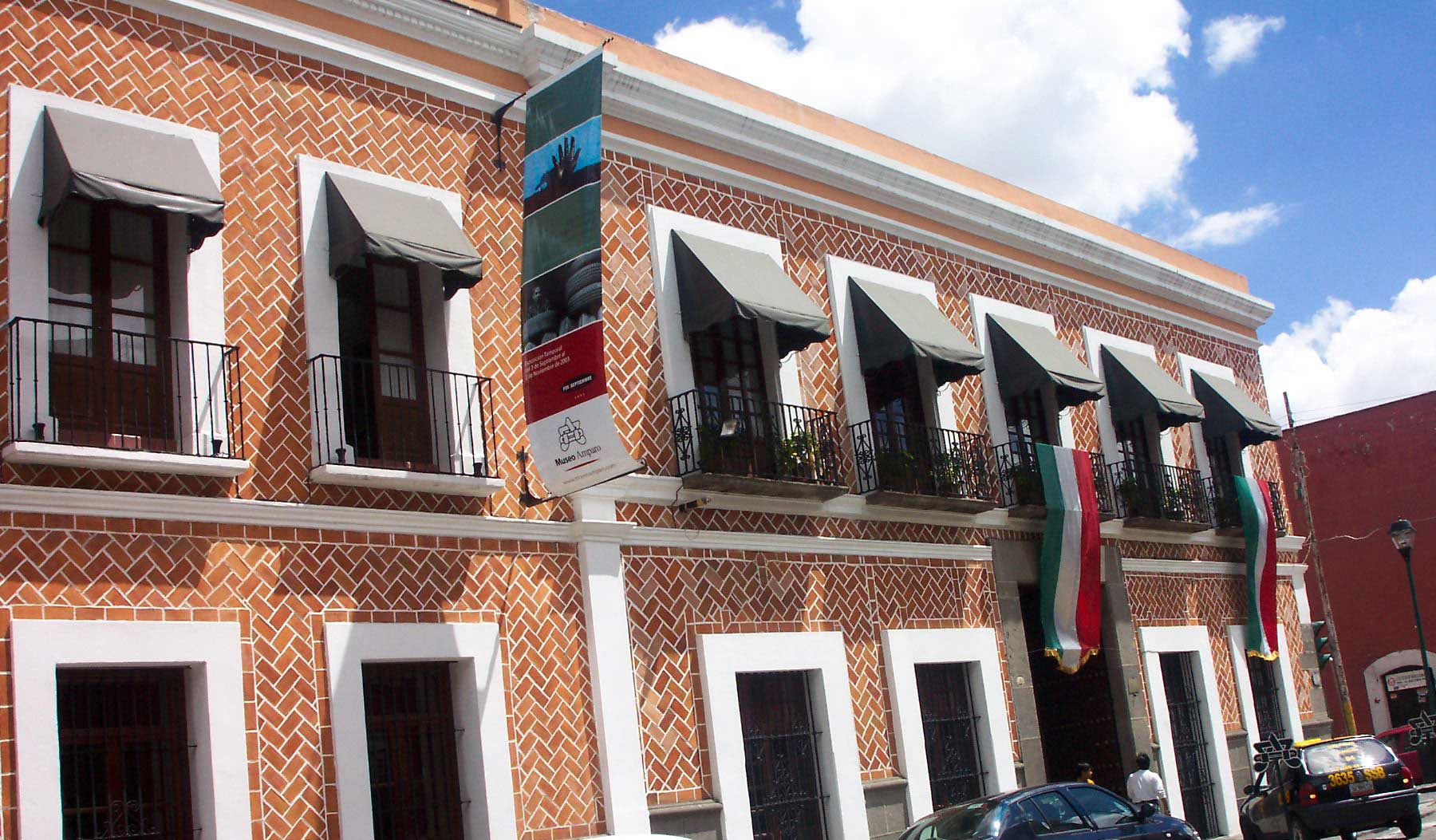
Facade of the Amparo Museum

The Museo Amparo, located in the historic center of Puebla City, is one of the most important historical museums in Mexico. It was inaugurated in 1991 and sponsored by the Amparo Foundation, which was founded in 1979 by Manuel Espinoza Yglesias in honor of his wife.

The museum is housed in two colonial-era buildings that date from the 17th and 18th centuries, which were popularly known as the Hospitalario. One of the buildings was the Hospital de Nuestra Señora y San Juan de Letrán founded in 1534. This building was made into a college for women by Bishop Juan de Palafox y Mendoza in the middle of the 18th century, and remained so until the 20th century. The other building is from the 18th century with a brick facade. It was part of the hospital for a time, then was converted into a “refuge” for married women. From 1871 to the 1980s, this building was the home of the Espinoza family. At that time, both buildings were restored and adapted for use as a museum.

The museum's permanent collection traces Mexico's development over its history. It has one of the most important collections of pre-Hispanic, colonial and modern art in Mexico, with dates of pieces ranging from 2,500 BCE to the present day, covering the pre-Classic period to the Spanish Conquest. The collection contains jars, figures, steles, altars, sculptures and utensils, from the Teotihuacan, Zapotec, Huastec, Totonac, Maya, Olmec, Chichimec, Mixtec and Aztec civilizations. The Colonial Area is concentrated what was the home of the Espinoza Family, occupying eleven halls. These halls have been decorated to imitate how homes looked like during the various centuries of the colonial period. These rooms are filled with furniture, wood and ivory sculptures, silver items, Talavera pottery and well as oil paintings.

Parts of the collection have been lent for temporary exhibits such as in Chapultepec Castle in Mexico City, including the museums emblematic pre-Hispanic piece, a throne from the late Classic Period from Rio Usumacinta, Chiapas. As a cultural center, the museum hosts temporary exhibits by national and international artists. It also presents conferences, seminars, concerts and workshops to support education, research and the creative arts.

It was one of the first museums in Mexico to integrate technology such as multimedia systems and interactive CDs, which can provide guided tours in English, Spanish, French and Japanese through twenty one computer stations located in the fourteen halls of the permanent collections. Because of its collection and avant-garde use of technology, this museum is considered to be one of the most important in Mexico and Latin America.
