= General I. Zaragoza metro station =

Monterrey metro station

General I. Zaragoza
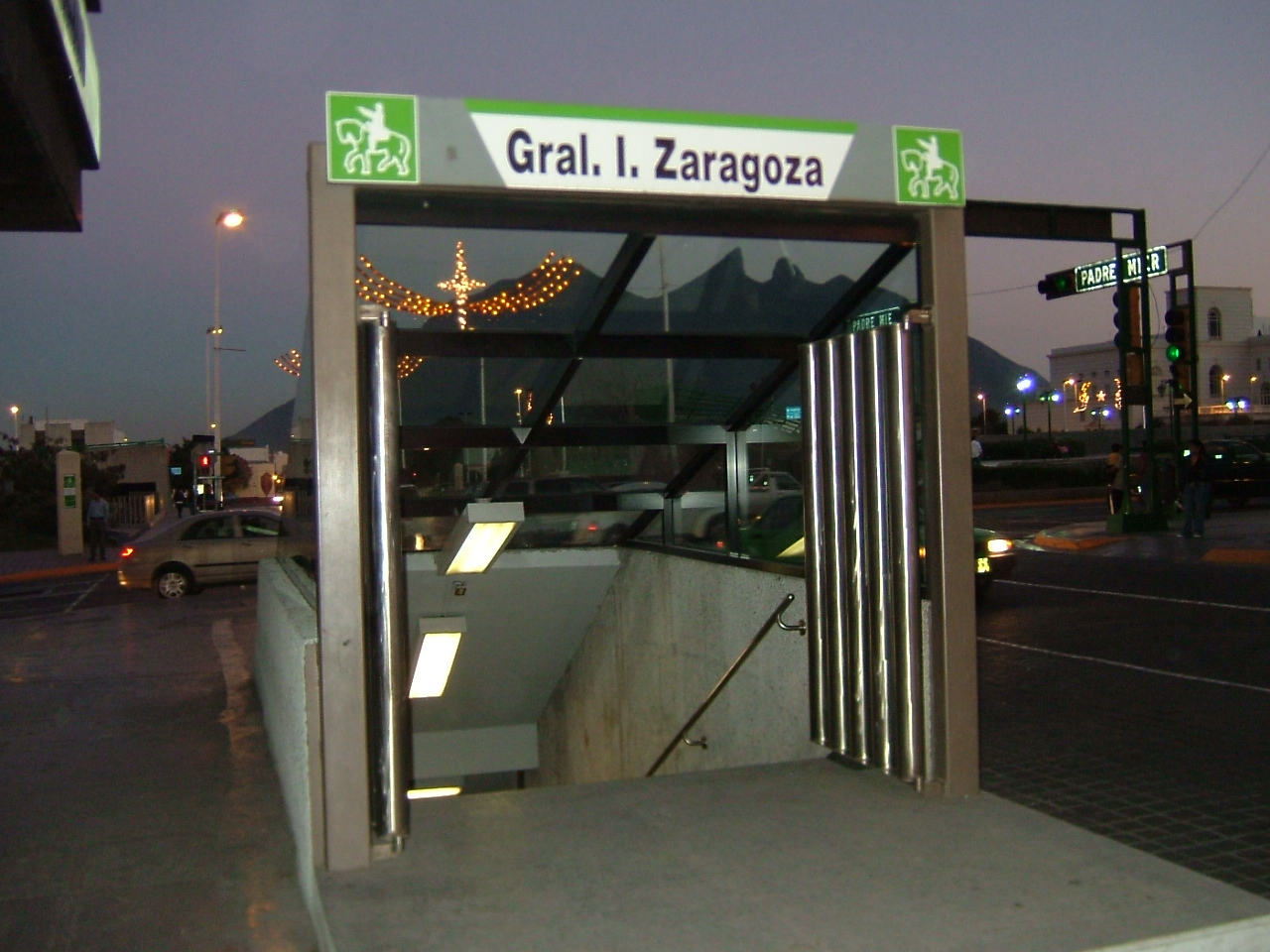

General information
- Location: Monterrey; Nuevo León, Mexico
- Coordinates: 25°40′04″N 100°18′37″W
- Operator: STC Metrorrey

History
- Opened: 30 November 1994

Services
Preceding station	Metrorrey	Following station
Padre Mier toward Sendero	Line 2	through to Line 3
through to Line 2	Line 3	Santa Lucía toward Hospital Metropolitano
Location

General I. Zaragoza (Spanish: Estación General I. Zaragoza or Terminal Zaragoza) is a station on Lines 2 and 3 of the Monterrey Metro. It is located in Monterrey, on the heart of the Macroplaza. The station was opened on 30 November 1994 as the eastern terminus of the inaugural section of Line 2, between General Anaya and Zaragoza.

This station serves the heart of the Monterrey shopping district. It is one block away from Morelos Street, and Monterrey's Zona Rosa, MARCO museum and the Monterrey City Hall. It is accessible for people with disabilities.

It is named after General Ignacio Zaragoza and the nearby Avenida Ignacio Zaragoza. The station logo depicts this Mexican military genius – the hero of the Battle of Puebla – astride his horse.

== See also ==
- List of Monterrey metro stations
