= Sendero metro station =

Monterrey metro station

Sendero

General information
- Location: Escobedo; Nuevo León, Mexico
- Coordinates: 25°46′07″N 100°17′34″W
- Operator: STC Metrorrey

Construction
- Accessible: Yes

History
- Opened: October 1, 2008

Services
Preceding station	Metrorrey	Following station
Terminus	Line 2	Santiago Tapia toward General I. Zaragoza
Location

The Sendero station (Spanish: Terminal Sendero) is a station on the Monterrey Metro. It is located in Escobedo, and is the northern terminus of Line 2. The station was opened on 1 October 2008 as the northern terminus of the extension of the line from Universidad.

== See also ==
- List of Monterrey metro stations
