= Metrorrey Line 6 =

Metro line in Monterrey, Mexico

Line 6
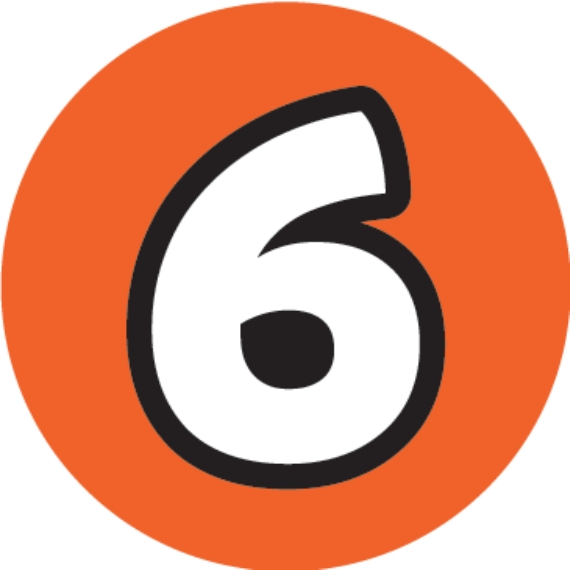

Overview
- Status: Under construction
- Owner: Government of the State of Nuevo León
- Locale: Monterrey
- Termini: Ginecología; Aeropuerto
- Stations: 20 in total: 15 under construction; 5 planned
- Website: https://www.nl.gob.mx/?P=metrorrey_principal

Service
- Type: Monorail
- System: Metrorrey
- Operator: Sistema de Transporte Colectivo Metrorrey

History
- Opened: By June 2026 (planned)

Technical
- Line length: 26.9 km (16.7 mi) total: 26.9 km (16.7 mi) under construction
Route map

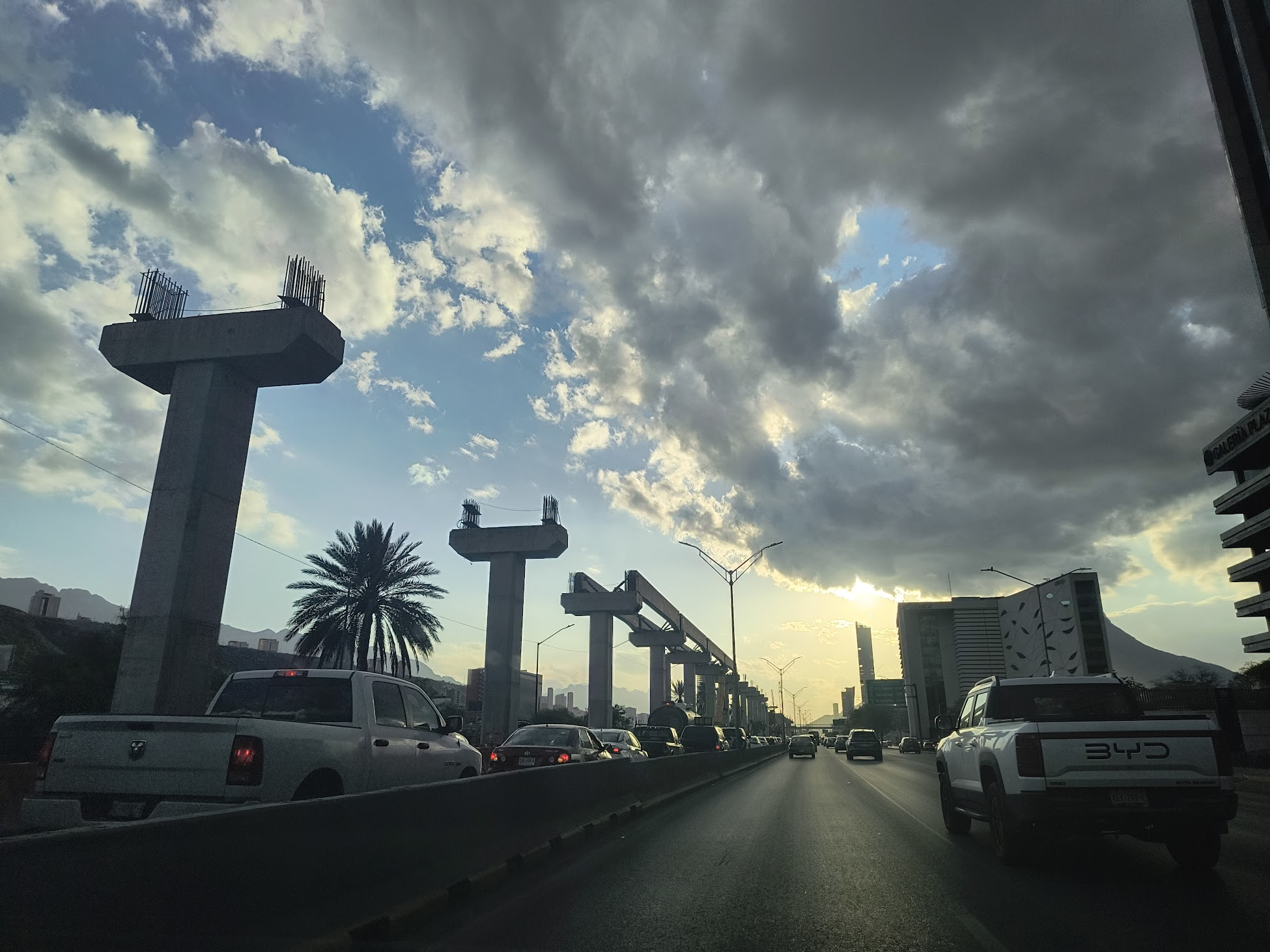
Monterrey Metro Line 6 monorail being constructed in May 2025

Metrorrey Line 6 is one of the three lines currently planned by Metrorrey, which will connect the municipalities of Monterrey, Guadalupe, San Nicolás de los Garza and Apodaca. It will have an extension of approximately 17.6 kilometers. It will connect with lines 3, 4 and 5 at the Saint Lucia station, in front of the High Specialty Medical Unit No. 33 of the Mexican Social Security Institute (IMSS). It connects to line 1 at the Y.A. station. Officially it does not have a distinctive color, but on the map, it is shown as purple.

On 29 April 2022, the Government of the State of Nuevo León launched an international public tender for the construction of the line. Construction work began on 11 February 2023. The second stage of the construction of 13.5 kilometers of lines 4 and 6 was expected to be completed on 30 November 2024. However, as of 29 May 2024, Lines 4 and 6 are now expected to be completed before the 2026 FIFA World Cup.

It will begin at the Hospital de Gynecología; in Monterrey, it continues along Avenida Constitución, Parque Fundidora, Prolongación Madero, Miguel Alemán Avenue, and ends in the center of the municipality of Apodaca.

Governor Samuel García has mentioned on several occasions an extension to the future that connects with Monterrey International Airport, located on the outskirts of the municipality of Apodaca.

== History ==
=== Line 5 controversy ===
In the early 2022, following the announcement of the first master plan of the new lines of the Metrorrey, neighbors of southern Monterrey demonstrated against the construction of line 5 by considering that a high viaduct will be detrimental to this whole sector, demanding that the line should be underground. They argued that lanes would be reduced on Garza Sada Avenue, businesses with the works would be closed and, in addition, aesthetically, will impact the properties and surplus value. For this reason, on 15 February 2022 they protested in front of the Palace of Government, where they delivered a letter addressed to the governor of Nuevo León, Samuel García, to listen to them and build Line 5 underground.

=== Line 6 project ===
After protests by the neighbors of the south of Monterrey, the government of Nuevo León announced that they would include in the master plan a Line 6 that would travel from the center of the municipality of Monterrey to the center of the municipality of Apodaca in case the construction of Line 5 was not possible. In March 2022, the governor of Nuevo León, Samuel García warned the opponents of Line 5, that the work will be built thus that it was announced that the three lines would be built.

=== Tendering process ===
On 9 September 2022, the technical openings were completed as part of the process of the international public tender, two consortia were registered to win the award of the construction of Lines 4, 5 and 6. One of the consortia is made up of the companies Mota-Engil Mexico and China Communications Construction Company, which also have the construction of a section of the Tren Maya. The other consortium consists of the companies Ferrovías del Bajío, Hércules Construcciones de Monterrey, Constructora Moyeda, Manufacturas Metálicas Ajax, Tordec, Inversiones Ferroviarias de México, Consega Diseño y Construcciones, and Vivienda y Construcciones.

On 15 September 2022 the economic proposals were submitted by both consortia and, in accordance with the timetable for the tender, on 23 September 2022 the final judgment was awarded to the winning consortium. During the presentation stage of economic proposals for construction, the Secretariat of Urban Mobility and Planning of Nuevo León rejected the proposal of the consortium composed of the Mexican companies Ferrovías del Bajío, Hércules Construcciones de Monterrey, Constructora Moyeda, Manufacturas Metálicas Ajax, Tordec, Inversiones Ferroviarias de México, Consega Diseño y Construcciones, and Vivienda y Construcciones. It was explained that in none of the above-mentioned contracts had the consortium built any light rail, metro, or monorail lines in the last 15 years. Similarly, they were made aware that braking traction systems and automatic driving systems have not been constructed or operated by any of the members of that consortium.

On 23 September 2022, the tender was awarded for the construction of lines 4, 5 and 6 of the Metro to the consortium formed by the Portuguese firm Mota-Engil de México and the Chinese CRRC Hong Kong. At a press conference, it was reported that CRRC will be the supplier of rolling stock, while Mota-Enegil will take care of the construction. The Secretary of Urban Mobility and Planning of Nuevo León Hernán Villarreal explained that the tender has two cost options and that both are profitable for the administration. If the 3 lines are raised, the amount will amount to 25.861 million pesos plus VAT. If line 5 is built at level, the cost would drop to 25.857 million pesos plus VAT. The consortium formed by Mota-Engil and CRRC will sign the contract on 26 September at 10:00, at the offices of the Legal Directorate of the Secretariat of Mobility and Urban Planning, located in the Administrative Tower. Regarding the possibility of building part of the transport system at the street level, during the reading of the failure of the SMPU-LPI-001-2022 tender it was specified that this topic will be defined in November 2024.

The construction process began on 30 September 2022 for lines 4 and 6 being monorail type. A popular consultation will be held in November 2024 to determine whether Metrorrey Line 5 will be an elevated monorail or a rapid transit line at ground level.

=== Protests on its construction ===
On 3 February 2023, a group of residents of the Linda Vista, Libertad and La Lolita colonies in the municipality of Guadalupe held a protest against the high construction of lines 5 and 6 of the Metrorrey. The demonstration took place on Miguel Alemán Avenue at the height of Larga Vista Street and was attended by approximately 30 people. The protest participants stated that they were not consulted on the construction of the subway and that they have had difficulty communicating with the authorities. The protest blankets reflected their opposition to the elevated construction of the subway, but supported underground construction because it would not affect traffic on Miguel Alemán Avenue. In addition, they asked Governor Samuel García for a detailed assessment of the construction of the subway line on Miguel Alemán Avenue, due to concerns about the presence of aquifer mantles on the avenue.

On 11 February 2023, dozens of people showed up outside an enclosure where state authorities were present to protest against the mobility projects promoted by the governor of Nuevo León, Samuel García. The protest took place during an event related to the start of the construction of Line 6 of the Metrorrey. Protesters expressed dissatisfaction with the construction projects of Metro lines 5, considering that their high format would generate obstructions to the road. However, they would agree to the realization of Line 6 in underground format.

=== Construction ===
At the beginning of 2023, it was announced that construction of the infrastructure of Line 6 would begin on February 11, 2023. This consisted of carrying out the first verification survey for the deep foundation. That day the construction start ceremony was held. The governor of Nuevo León Samuel García led the event. The construction of Line 6 is expected to provide services to more than 120 thousand users and is part of the pillars of the Mobility Master Plan, with the aim of improving mobility in the Monterrey metropolitan area. The ceremony was attended by the technical secretary of the State, Mario Ramón Silva Rodríguez, and the secretary of Mobility and Urban Planning, Hernán Manuel Villarreal Rodríguez, among others. Governor García assured that the construction will be carried out efficiently, effectively and quickly, without causing an impact on the citizens.

Within the framework of the construction of Metro Line 6, tasks have been planned that include the layout, station design, rolling stock, yard and workshop, as well as road adaptations on its route. The first phase of Line 6 will have a length of 9 kilometers, from the Y Griega to Citadel, passing through the municipalities of Monterrey, Guadalupe, San Nicolás de los Garza and Apodaca.

The Secretary of Mobility and Urban Planning, Hernán Manuel Villarreal Rodríguez, reported that the construction process of Line 6 will begin with a section that will include the Citadel station, where the yard will be located and the rolling stock will be stored. The official asked the population for patience during the work, since, although it has been planned to avoid the closure of roads and allow the transit of urban public transport along its usual routes, it will be necessary to reduce from one to two central lanes during the drilling period. for the foundation and two to three lanes during the construction stage.

On 25 May 2024, the first monorail car for the future Line 6 was exhibited to the public. On 29 May 2024, Samuel García announced that Lines 4 and 6 were 30% complete, and that they will be opened in time for the 2026 FIFA World Cup: that is, before June 2026.

On 27 April 2026, static and technical tests began on a 1.3 kilometer section between the yard at Citadelle and La Fé station and three days later governor Samuel García announced the opening phase of Line 6, which includes La Fé, Churubusco, Y Griega and Parque Fundidora stations and is expected to open on June 3. After a test trip with the governor to the Parque Fundidora station took place on May 31st, the director of Metrorrey, Abraham Vargas, had to announce the next day that the monorail was not yet available for the World Cup. Although the test phase could be brought forward by three weeks, it has not yet been completed. Therefore, no completion date can be given for this section of the project.

== Stations ==
Station	Opening	Location	Municipality	Connections	Type	Level
Ginecología	2027	Avenida Constitución con Avenida Félix Uresti Gómez	Monterrey	Metrorrey Line 3 Metrorrey Line 4	Terminal and transfer	Elevated
Parque Fundidora	June 2026	Calle Washington con Avenida Fundidora	Monterrey	-	Intermediate stop	Elevated
Y Griega	June 2026	Calzada Francisco I. Madero con Avenida Cristóbal Colón	Monterrey	Metrorrey Line 1	Transfer	Elevated
Churubusco	June 2026	Avenida Miguel Alemán con Avenida Constituyentes de Nuevo León	Guadalupe	-	Intermediate stop	Elevated
Lindavista	December 2026	Avenida Miguel Alemán con Monumento a la Madre	Guadalupe	-	Intermediate stop	Elevated
Libertad	Unknown	Avenida Miguel Alemán con Avenida Azteca	Guadalupe	-	Intermediate stop	Elevated
Bonifacio Salinas	December 2026	Avenida Miguel Alemán con Avenida General Bonifacio Salinas	Guadalupe	-	Intermediate stop	Elevated
San Rafael	December 2026	Avenida Miguel Alemán con Calle Lázaro Cárdenas	Guadalupe	-	Intermediate stop	Elevated
La Victoria	December 2026	Avenida Miguel Alemán con Avenida Ruiz Cortínes	Guadalupe	Ecovía	Transfer	Elevated
La Talaverna	December 2026	Avenida Miguel Alemán con Calle Trabajadores Cetemistas	San Nicolás de los Garza	-	Intermediate stop	Elevated
La Fé	June 2026	Avenida Miguel Alemán con Calle Abrevadero	San Nicolás de los Garza	-	Intermediate stop	Elevated
Citadel	Unknown	Avenida Miguel Alemán con Avenida Rómulo Garza	San Nicolás de los Garza	-	Intermediate stop	Elevated
Isidoro Sepúlveda	2027	Avenida Miguel Alemán con Avenida Isidoro Sepúlveda Martínez	Apodaca	-	Intermediate stop	Elevated
Julián Treviño	2027	Avenida Miguel Alemán con Boulevard Julián Treviño Elizondo	Apodaca	-	Intermediate stop	Elevated
El Milagro	2027	Avenida Miguel Alemán con Avenida Milimex	Apodaca	-	Intermediate stop	Elevated
Concordia	Unknown	Avenida Miguel Alemán con Avenida Casa Blanca	Apodaca	-	Intermediate stop	Elevated
Apodaca centro	2027	Avenida Miguel Alemán con Boulevard Carlos Salinas de Gortari	Apodaca	-	Transfer	Elevated
Parque industrial	Unknown	Avenida Miguel Alemán con Avenida Arco Vial	Apodaca	-	Intermediate stop	Elevated
Hospital de zona 67	Unknown	Avenida Miguel Alemán con Bulevar Aeropuerto Frente al Hospital de zona del IMSS 67	Apodaca	-	Intermediate stop	Elevated
Aeropuerto	2027	Boulevard Aeropuerto	Apodaca	-	Terminal and transfer	Elevated

== See also ==
- Metrorrey
  - Metrorrey Line 1
  - Metrorrey Line 2
  - Metrorrey Line 3
  - Metrorrey Line 4
  - Metrorrey Line 5
- Ecovía
