= Eloy Cavazos metro station =

Monterrey metro station

Eloy Cavazos
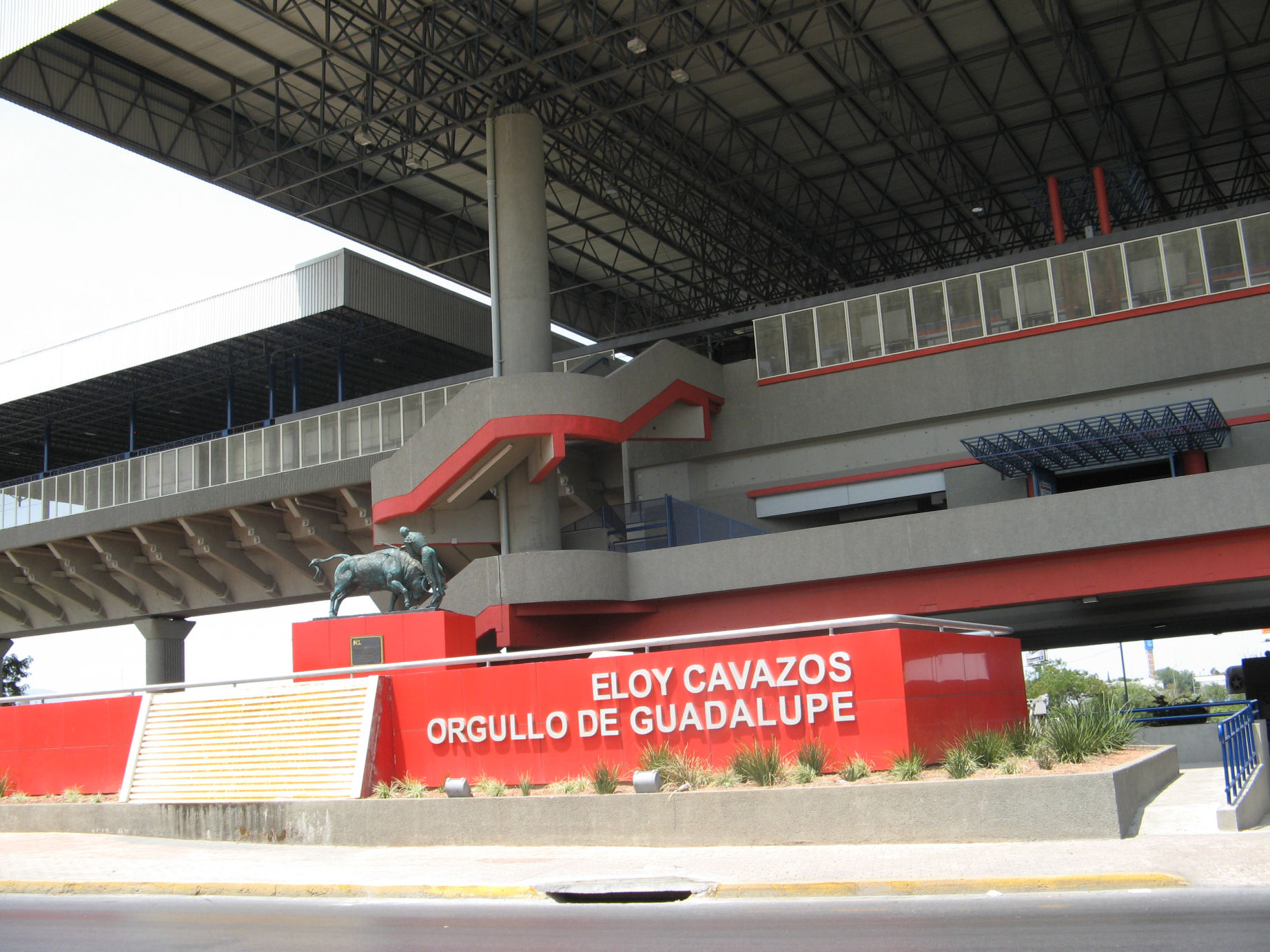

General information
- Location: Calle Benito Juárez, Guadalupe; Nuevo León, Mexico
- Coordinates: 25°40′48″N 100°15′51″W
- Operator: STC Metrorrey

Construction
- Accessible: Yes

History
- Opened: 25 April 1991; 35 years ago

Services
Preceding station	Metrorrey	Following station
Y Griega toward Talleres	Line 1	Lerdo de Tejada toward Exposición
Location

The Eloy Cavazos Station (Spanish: Estación Eloy Cavazos) is a station on Line 1 of the Monterrey Metro. It is located on Avenue Juarez next to the Santa Catarina river in Guadalupe, Nuevo León, Mexico. The station was opened on 25 April 1991 as part of the inaugural section of Line 1, going from San Bernabé to Exposición.

== General information ==
The station was formerly known as "Palacio Federal" (because of the "Palacio Federal", a Federal Government office building nearby). On 28 August 2006, this station was renamed after Eloy Cavazos, the worldwide known matador, on the 40th anniversary of his "alternativa".

This station is the first one located in Guadalupe and the south side of the Santa Catarina river. There is a small plaza in the bottom floor, it has benches and beverage vending machines. This station is accessible for people with disabilities.
