= Penitenciaría metro station =

Monterrey metro station

Penitenciaría
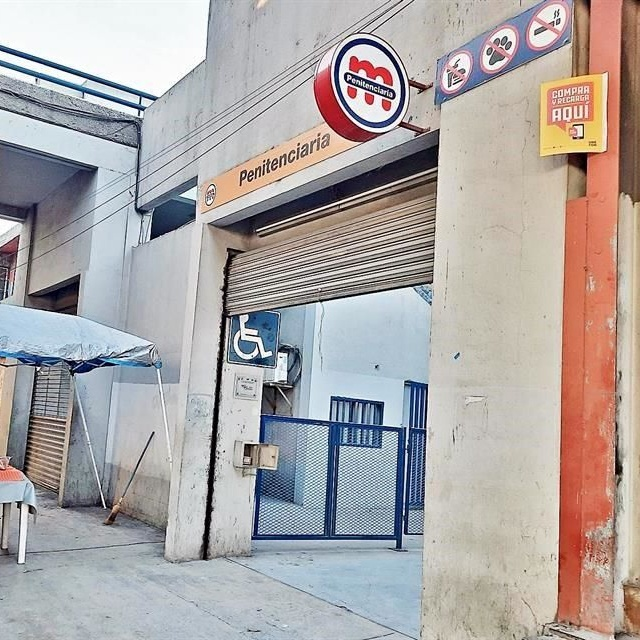

General information
- Location: Monterrey, Nuevo León; Mexico
- Coordinates: 25°43′24″N 100°20′33″W
- Operator: STC Metrorrey

Construction
- Accessible: Yes

History
- Opened: 25 April 1991; 35 years ago

Services
Preceding station	Metrorrey	Following station
Aztlán toward Talleres	Line 1	Alfonso Reyes toward Exposición
Location

Penitenciaría (Spanish: Estación de Penitenciaría) is a station on Line 1 of the Monterrey Metro. Its location is at Rodrigo Gómez Avenue in Monterrey, near the state criminal courthouses and Topo Chico prison. The station was opened on 25 April 1991 as part of the inaugural section of Line 1, going from San Bernabé to Exposición.

This station serves the Simón Bolivar neighborhood (Colonia Simón Bolivar) and also to Valle Morelos. It is accessible for people with disabilities.

This station is named after the nearby criminal facilities (Spanish: penitenciaría, lit. 'penitentiary') and its logo represents the scale of Lady Justice.
