= Edison metro station =

Monterrey metro station

Edison
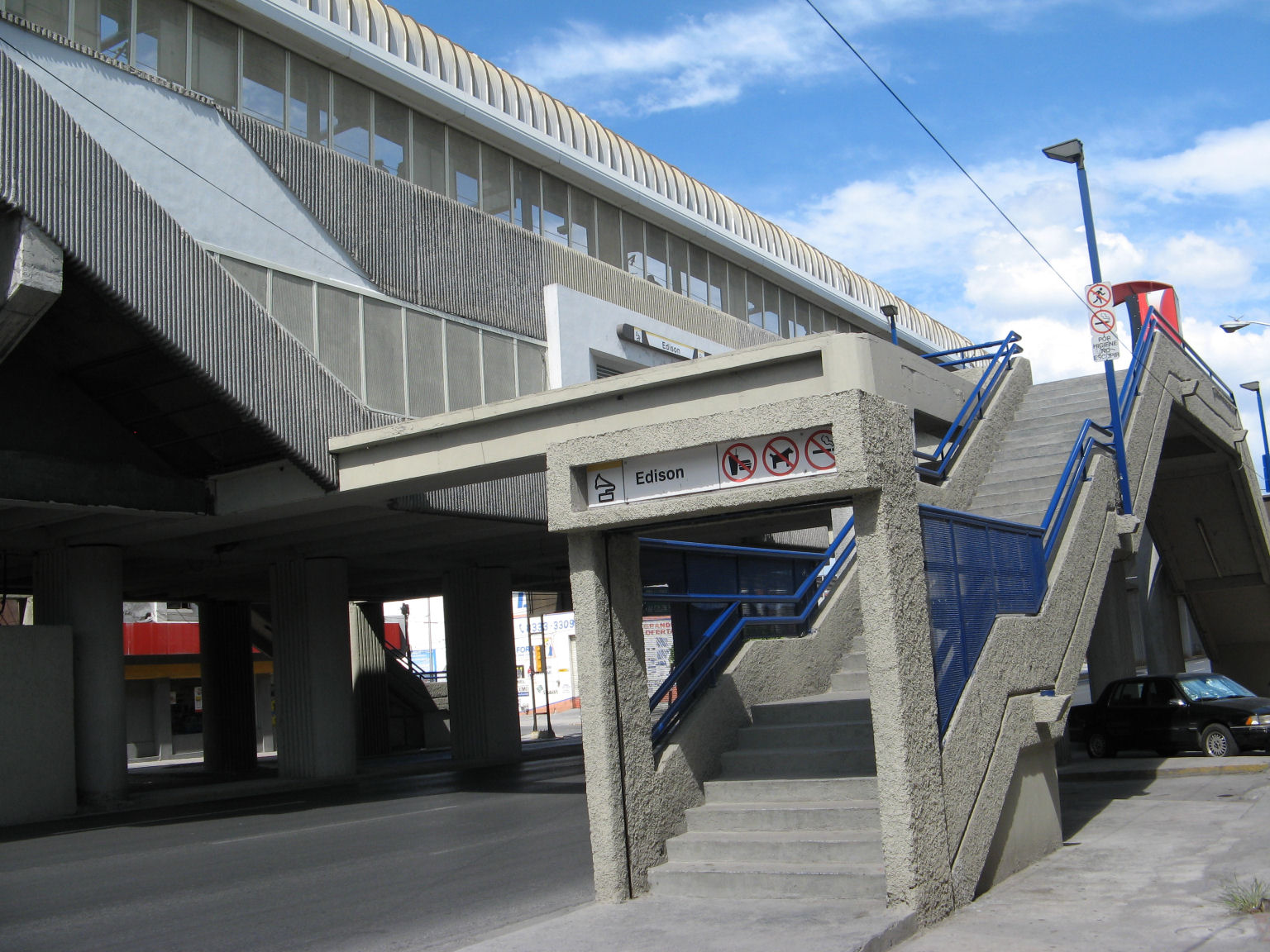

General information
- Location: Monterrey; Nuevo León, Mexico
- Coordinates: 25°41′13″N 100°20′01″W
- Operator: STC Metrorrey

Construction
- Accessible: Yes

History
- Opened: 25 April 1991; 35 years ago

Services
Preceding station	Metrorrey	Following station
Hospital toward Talleres	Line 1	Central toward Exposición
Location

The Edison Station (Spanish: Estación Edison) is a station on Line 1 of the Monterrey Metro. It is located in Monterrey, Mexico at the intersection of Edison street and Colon Avenue in the Monterrey Centre. This station is located in the Colon Avenue in the northeast side of the Monterrey Centre. The station was opened on 25 April 1991 as part of the inaugural section of Line 1, going from San Bernabé to Exposición.

This station serves the west side of the downtown area and also the Talleres neighborhood (Colonia Talleres). It is accessible for people with disabilities.

This station is named after Edison Avenue, and its logo represents a phonograph, one of the inventions of Thomas Edison, whom the avenue is named after.
