= Del Golfo metro station =

Monterrey metro station

Del Golfo
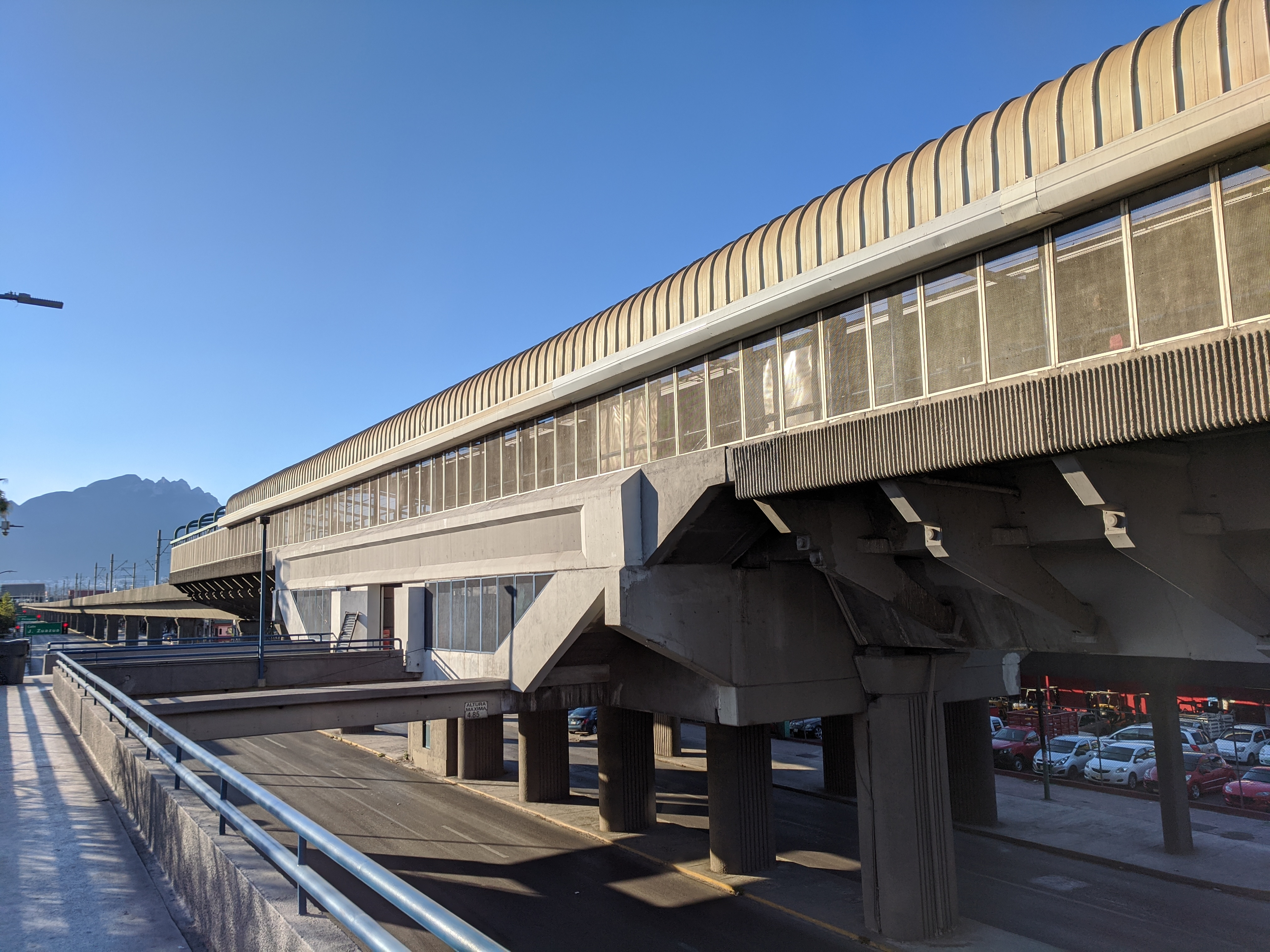

General information
- Location: Monterrey; Nuevo León, Mexico
- Coordinates: 25°41′06″N 100°18′24″W
- Operator: STC Metrorrey

Construction
- Accessible: Yes

History
- Opened: 25 April 1991; 35 years ago

Services
Preceding station	Metrorrey	Following station
Cuauhtémoc toward Talleres	Line 1	Félix U. Gómez toward Exposición
Location

The Del Golfo Station (Spanish: Estación Del Golfo) is a station on Line 1 of the Monterrey Metro. This station is located in the Colon Avenue in the northeast side of the Monterrey Centre. The station was opened on 25 April 1991 as part of the inaugural section of Line 1, going from San Bernabé to Exposición.

This station serves the northeast side of the city centre and the Treviño neighborhood (Colonia Treviño). This station is near the old "Del Golfo" railroad station (now The Railroad Museum and the State Culture House), it is accessible for people with disabilities.

This station is named after the old "Del Golfo" railroad station, and its logo represents the facade of that building.
