= Metrorrey Line 4 =

Monorail line in Nuevo León, Mexico

Line 4
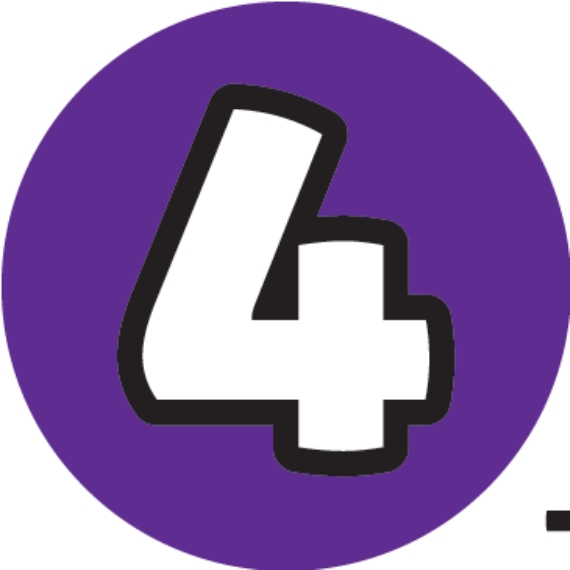

Overview
- Status: Under construction
- Owner: Government of the State of Nuevo León
- Locale: Monterrey
- Termini: Ginecología; Tren del Norte
- Stations: 10 in total: 7 under construction; 3 planned

Service
- Type: Monorail
- System: Metrorrey
- Operator: Sistema de Transporte Colectivo Metrorrey

History
- Opened: By June 2027(planned)

Technical
- Line length: 7.5 km (4.7 mi)
- Track gauge: Monorail
Route map

Metrorrey Line 4 is an under-construction Metrorrey line that will serve the municipalities of Monterrey and San Pedro Garza García. The straddle-beam monorail will have an extension of approximately 7.5 kilometers with seven stations in the first phase and will connect with Line 6 at shared Ginecología station and with Line 3 at the Saint Lucia station (in front of the High Specialty Medical Unit No. 23 of the Mexican Social Security Institute).

== History ==
=== First hints ===
In April 2014, the president of Mexico, Enrique Peña Nieto, announced, in his speech at the 70th assembly of the Chamber of the Transformation Industry of Nuevo León, said that resources had been given to Nuevo León for the construction of Metrorrey Lines 3 and 4. In addition to the possibility of a new line, extensions to lines 1 and 2 were considered. The first option was to expand the viaduct of Line 1, from the Exhibition station, in Guadalupe, to Juárez and Cadereyta, via the free road to Reynosa. The second option was to continue the work of Line 3, which at that time was under construction, from the Metropolitan Hospital, in San Nicolás, to the municipality of Apodaca, using the corridor of López Mateos Avenue. A third option envisaged building the Mederos unit of the Autonomous University of Nuevo León, starting from a terminal in front of the High Specialty Medical Unit No. 23 of the Mexican Social Security Institute in Felix U. Gómez and with a tour of Eugenio Garza Sada Avenue. Finally, the viaduct to the west of the metropolitan area was analyzed to build, in order to benefit the inhabitants of San Pedro Garza García, Santa Catarina, and García, but the outline of this option was not revealed by the state government.

=== Current proposal ===
In late 2021, governor of Nuevo León Samuel García announced the construction of Metrorrey Lines 4 and 5, then reported through a video on his social networks the place where the new metro lines will pass. The first plan presented provided that line 4 would go from the center of the municipality of Santa Catarina to the center of Monterrey having an original extension of 13.6 kilometers. In the publication of the tender it was cut to 7.5 kilometers ending in the colony of San Jerónimo on the borders of Monterrey and San Pedro Garza García since the master plan and the plans for the Tren Suburbano de Monterrey was updated it will pass to the center of the municipality of Santa Catarina.

=== Tendering process ===
On 29 April 2022, the Government of the State of Nuevo León launched an international public tender for the construction of the line. Construction work was expected to begin on 31 August 2022 and end on 31 August 2027. The second phase of the construction of 13.5 kilometres of lines 4 and 6 was expected to be completed on 30 November 2024, though as of May 2024, Governor Samuel García expects lines 4 and 6 to be ready by the time the 2026 FIFA World Cup happens in June 2026.

On 9 September 2022, the technical openings were completed as part of the process of the international public tender, two consortia were registered to win the award of the construction of Lines 4, 5 and 6. One of the consortia was made up of the companies Mota-Engil Mexico and China Communications Construction Company, which also have the construction of a section of the Tren Maya. The other consortium consisted of the companies Ferrovías del Bajío, Hércules Construcciones de Monterrey, Constructora Moyeda, Manufacturas Metálicas Ajax, Tordec, Inversiones Ferroviarias de México, Consega Diseño y Construcciones, and Vivienda y Construcciones.

On 15 September 2022 the economic proposals were submitted by both consortia and, in accordance with the timetable for the tender, on 23 September 2022 the final judgment was awarded to the winning consortium. During the presentation stage of economic proposals for construction, the Secretariat of Urban Mobility and Planning of Nuevo León rejected the proposal of the consortium composed of the Mexican companies Ferrovías del Bajío, Hércules Construcciones de Monterrey, Constructora Moyeda, Manufacturas Metálicas Ajax, Tordec, Inversiones Ferroviarias de México, Consega Diseño y Construcciones, and Vivienda y Construcciones. It was explained that in none of the above-mentioned contracts had the consortium built any light rail, metro, or monorail lines in the last 15 years. Similarly, they were made aware that braking traction systems and automatic driving systems have not been constructed or operated by any of the members of that consortium.

On 23 September 2022, the tender was awarded for the construction of lines 4, 5 and 6 of the Metro to the consortium formed by the Portuguese firm Mota-Engil de México and the Chinese CRRC Hong Kong. At a press conference, it was reported that CRRC will be the supplier of rolling stock, while Mota-Enegil will take care of the construction. The Secretary of Urban Mobility and Planning of Nuevo León Hernán Villarreal explained that the tender has two cost options and that both are profitable for the administration. If the 3 lines are raised, the amount will amount to 25.861 million pesos plus VAT. If line 5 is built at level, the cost would drop to 25.857 million pesos plus VAT. The consortium formed by Mota-Engil and CRRC will sign the contract on 26 September at 10:00, at the offices of the Legal Directorate of the Secretariat of Mobility and Urban Planning, located in the Administrative Tower. Regarding the possibility of building part of the transport system at the street level, during the reading of the failure of the SMPU-LPI-001-2022 tender it was specified that this topic will be defined in November 2024.

The construction process was scheduled to begin on 30 September 2022 for lines 4 and 6 being monorail type.

=== Construction ===
On 11 April 2023, work began between the Hospital de Ginecología (Santa Lucía), now named only Ginecología and Macroplaza stations, formerly known as Juárez (Pavilion M) station. On May 4, it was announced that the work of these two stations is expected to be completed in May 2024, and then the work to the Miravalle area will continue.

As on Line 6, there are massive construction delays here; in April 2024, less than a tenth of the track supports were in place on this section and by August, just about a fifth of the line had been completed. In March 2025, it was announced that three stations along the route would not be built for the time being. At that point, just under a quarter of the construction work had been completed, and the opening is now scheduled for June 2027

== See also ==
- Metrorrey
  - Metrorrey Line 1
  - Metrorrey Line 2
  - Metrorrey Line 3
  - Metrorrey Line 5
  - Metrorrey Line 6
- Ecovía
