= Simón Bolívar metro station (Monterrey) =

Monterrey metro station

Simón Bolívar
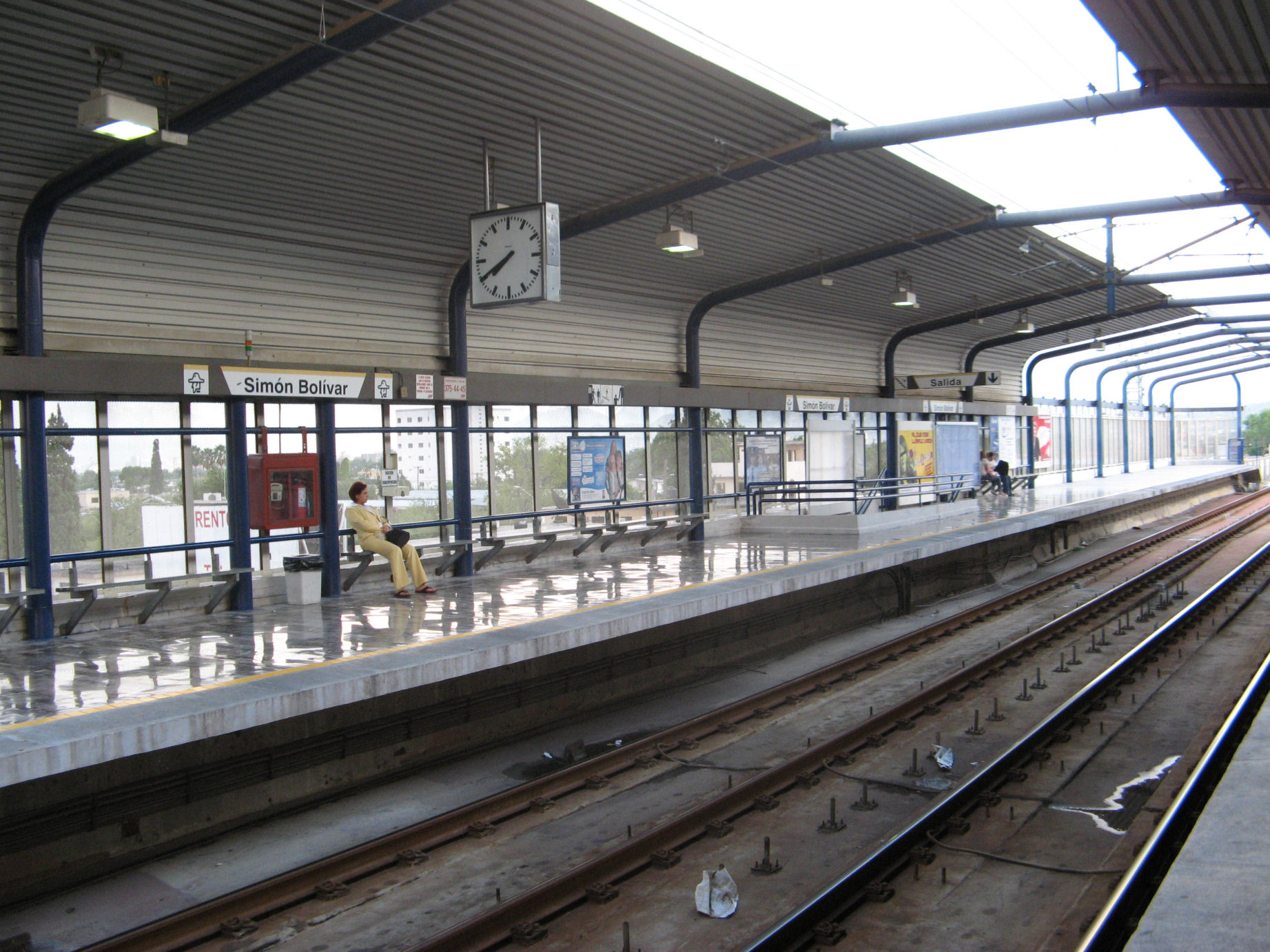

General information
- Location: Simón Bolivar Avenue, Monterrey; Nuevo León, Mexico
- Coordinates: 25°41′57″N 100°20′36″W
- Operator: STC Metrorrey

Construction
- Accessible: Yes

History
- Opened: 25 April 1991; 35 years ago

Services
| Preceding station | Metrorrey | Following station |
|---|---|---|
| Mitras toward Talleres | Line 1 | Hospital toward Exposición |
Location

The Simón Bolívar Station (Spanish: Estación Simón Bolívar) is a station on Line 1 of the Monterrey Metro. It is located on Simón Bolivar Avenue. This station is located in the Colon Avenue in the northeast side of the Monterrey Centre. The station was opened on 25 April 1991 as part of the inaugural section of Line 1, going from San Bernabé to Exposición.

This station serves the Central Mitras neighborhood (Colonia Mitras Centro), it is accessible for people with disabilities.

This station is named after Simón Bolivar Avenue, and its logo represents a stylized head shot of Simón Bolivar, one of the Liberators of Spanish South America.
