= Hospital metro station (Monterrey) =

Monterrey metro station

Hospital
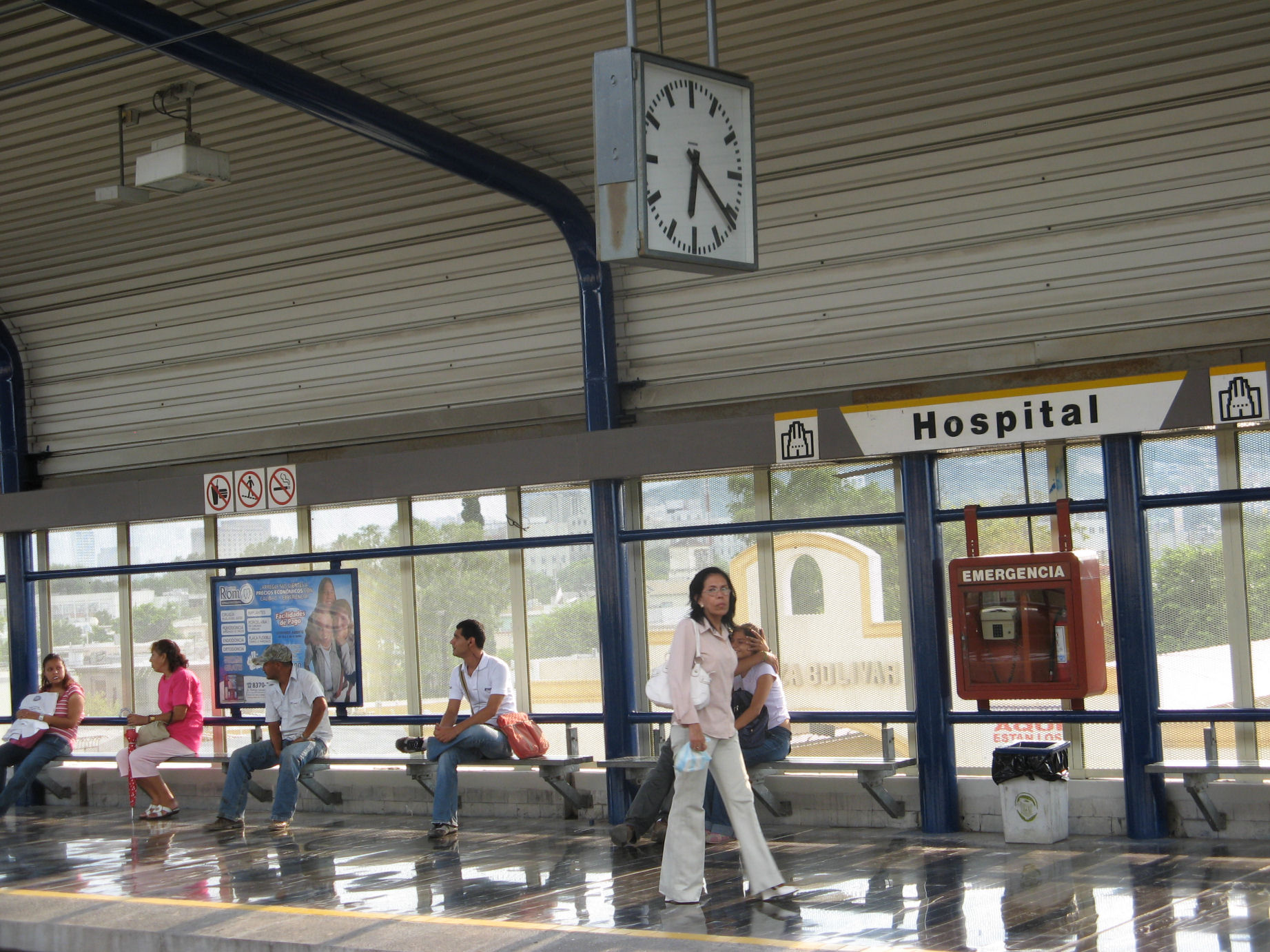

General information
- Location: Monterrey, Nuevo León; Mexico
- Coordinates: 25°41′31″N 100°20′39″W
- Operator: STC Metrorrey

Construction
- Accessible: Yes

History
- Opened: 25 April 1991; 35 years ago

Services
Preceding station	Metrorrey	Following station
Simón Bolívar toward Talleres	Line 1	Edison toward Exposición
Location

The Hospital Station (Spanish: Estación Hospital) is a station on Line 1 of the Monterrey Metro. It is located on Simón Bolivar Avenue near the Universidad Autónoma de Nuevo León (UANL) Medical Campus and the University Hospital (Hospital Civil). This station is located in the Colon Avenue in the northeast side of the Monterrey Centre. The station was opened on 25 April 1991 as part of the inaugural section of Line 1, going from San Bernabé to Exposición.

This station serves the Central Mitras and South Mitras neighborhoods (Colonia Mitras Centro y Mitras Sur), and is accessible for people with disabilities.

This station is named after medical facilities nearby, and its logo represents a hospital.
