= Aztlán metro station =

Monterrey metro station

Aztlán
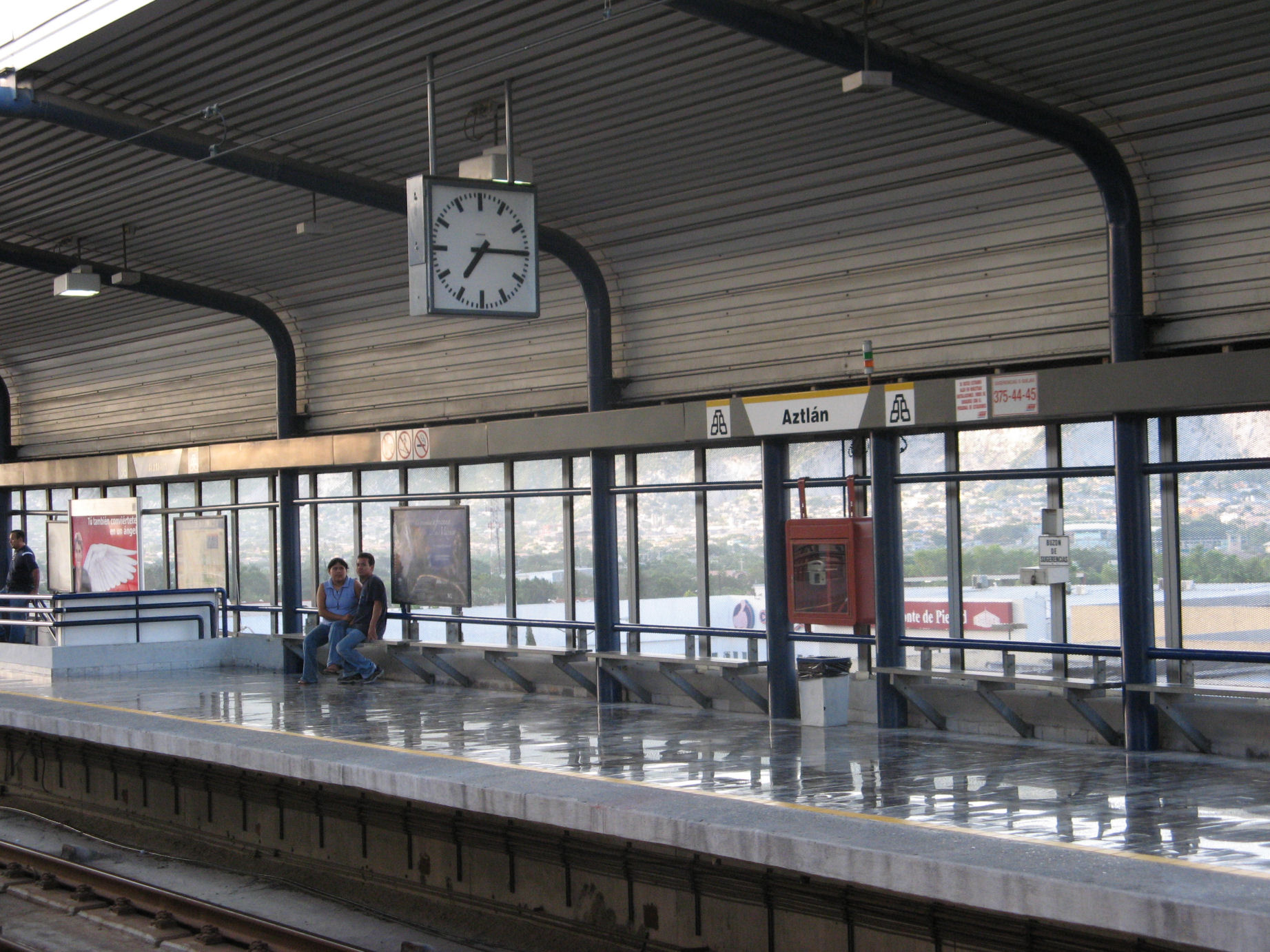

General information
- Location: Monterrey, Nuevo León; Mexico
- Coordinates: 25°43′56″N 100°20′51″W
- Operator: STC Metrorrey

Construction
- Accessible: Yes

History
- Opened: 25 April 1991; 35 years ago

Services
| Preceding station | Metrorrey | Following station |
|---|---|---|
| Unidad Modelo toward Talleres | Line 1 | Penitenciaría toward Exposición |
Location

Aztlán Station (Spanish: Estación Aztlán) is a station on Line 1 of the Monterrey Metro. This station is located on Aztlán Avenue in Monterrey. This station is located in the Colon Avenue in the northeast side of the Monterrey Centre. It was opened on 25 April 1991 as part of the inaugural section of Line 1, between San Bernabé and Exposición.

This station serves the heavy populated Aztlán, Nueva Galicia and Valle del Topo Chico neighborhoods, there's an IMSS hospital, a supermarket, and several stores near the station. It is accessible for people with disabilities.

This station is named after Aztlán Avenue, and its logo represents an Aztec pyramid since Aztlán is a legendary aztec city.
