= Central metro station (Monterrey) =

Monterrey metro station

Central
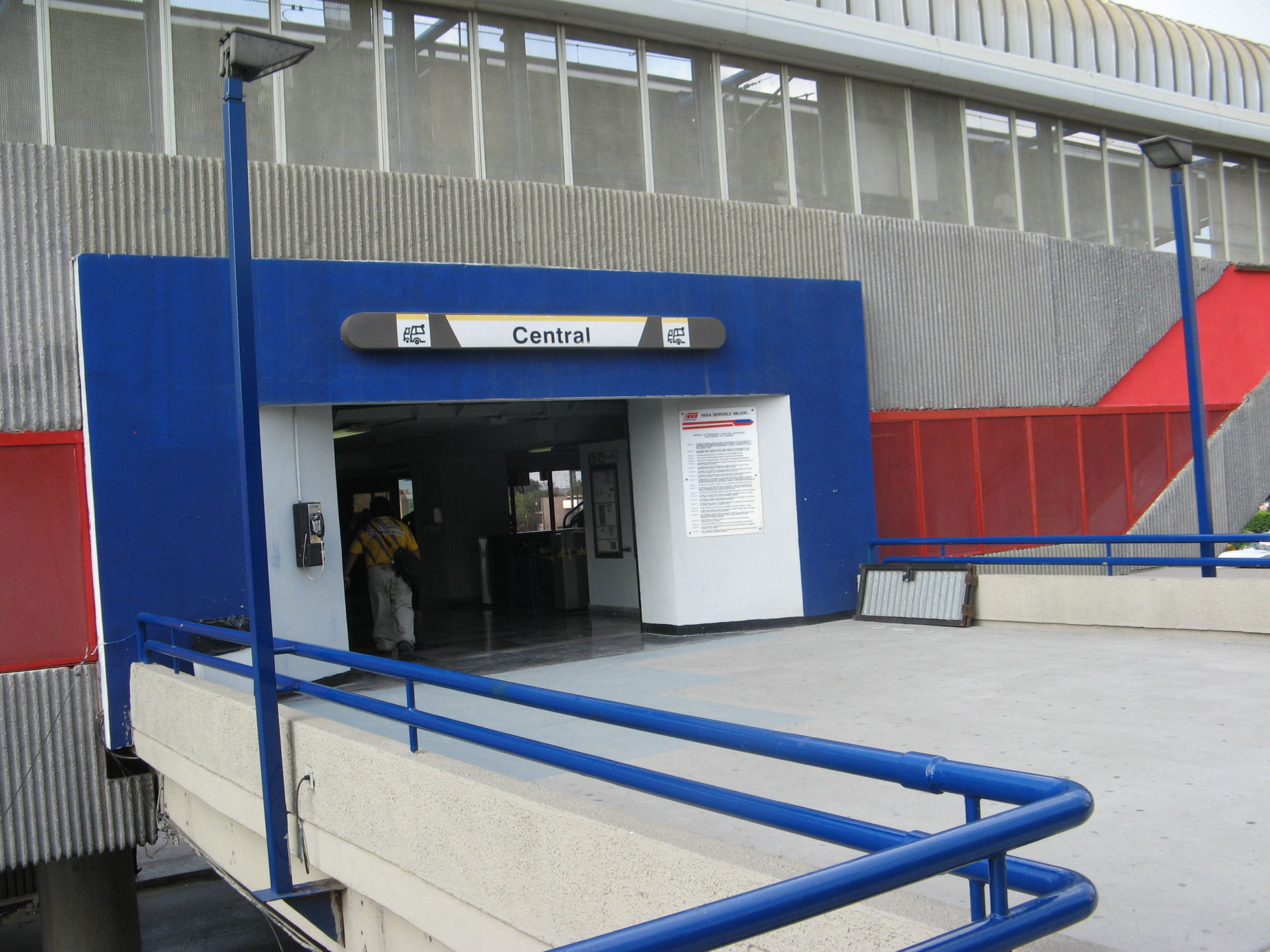

General information
- Location: Monterrey; Nuevo León, Mexico
- Coordinates: 25°41′13″N 100°19′28″W
- Operator: STC Metrorrey

Construction
- Accessible: Yes

History
- Opened: 25 April 1991; 35 years ago

Services
Preceding station	Metrorrey	Following station
Edison toward Talleres	Line 1	Cuauhtémoc toward Exposición
Location

The Central Station (Spanish: Estación Central) is a station on Line 1 of the Monterrey Metro. It is located on Madero Avenue in the Monterrey Centre. This station is located on Colon Avenue on the northeast side of the Monterrey Centre. The station was opened on 25 April 1991 as part of the inaugural section of Line 1, which runs from San Bernabé to Exposición.

This station serves the northwest side of the downtown area as well as the Monterrey Bus Depot (Central de Autobuses). It is accessible for people with disabilities.

This station is named after the Bus Depot nearby, and its logo represents a couple of buses.
