= Mitras metro station =

Monterrey metro station

Mitras
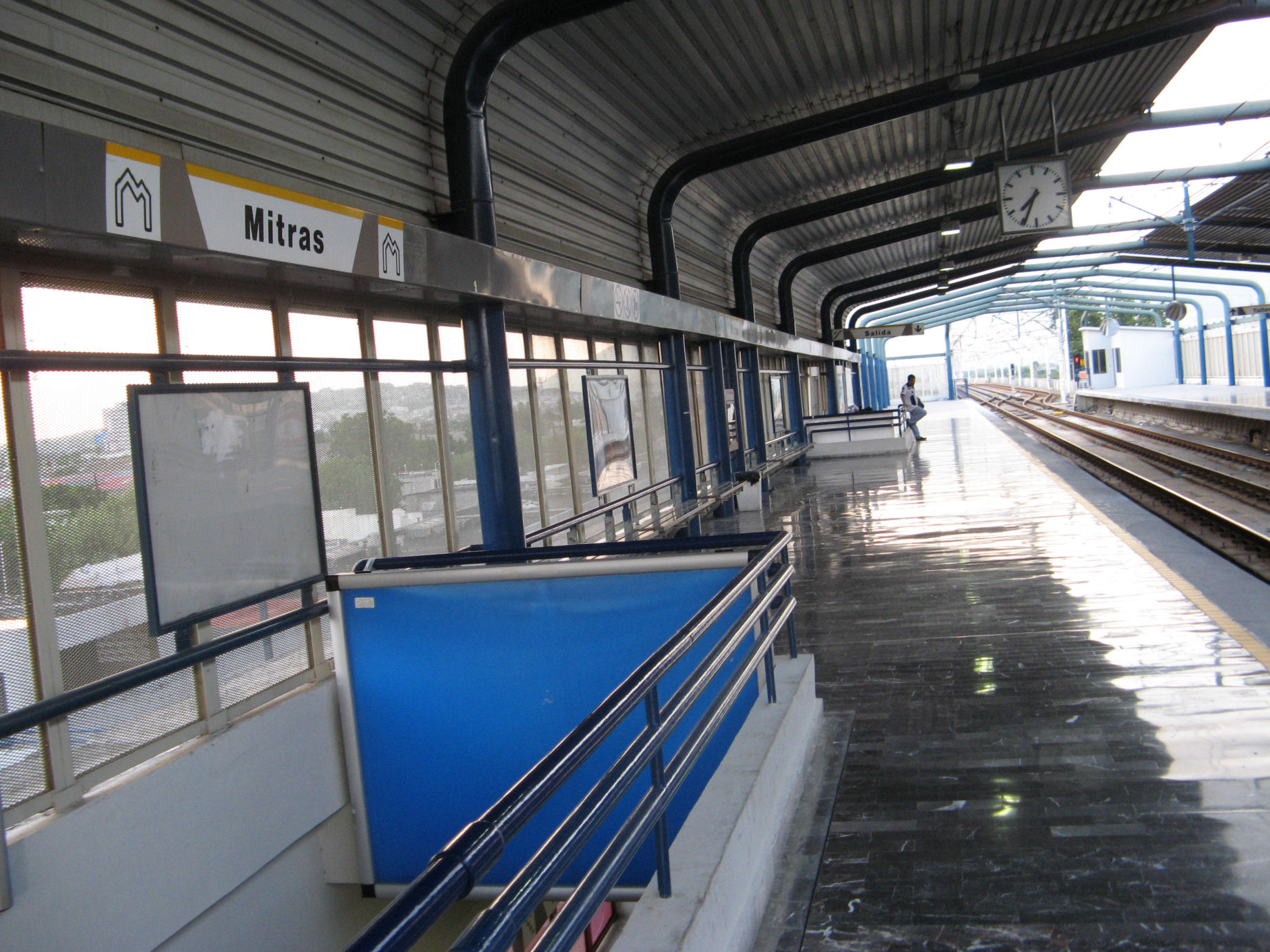

General information
- Location: Monterrey, Nuevo León; Mexico
- Coordinates: 25°42′20″N 100°20′33″W
- Operator: STC Metrorrey

Construction
- Accessible: Yes

History
- Opened: 25 April 1991; 35 years ago

Services
Preceding station	Metrorrey	Following station
Alfonso Reyes toward Talleres	Line 1	Simón Bolívar toward Exposición
Location

Mitras Station (Spanish: Estación Mitras) is a station on Line 1 of the Monterrey Metro in Monterrey, Mexico. It is located in the intersection of Simón Bolívar and Ruiz Cortinez Avenues. This station is located in the Colon Avenue in the northeast side of the Monterrey Centre. The station was opened on 25 April 1991 as part of the inaugural section of Line 1, going from San Bernabé to Exposición.

This station serves the Mitras Norte and Bernardo Reyes neighborhoods (Colonias Mitras Norte y Bernardo Reyes). It is accessible for people with disabilities.

This station is named after the Mitras neighborhood, and its logo represents the Cerro de las Mitras ('Miter Hill').
