= Metrorrey Line 5 =

Metro line in Monterrey, Mexico

Line 5

Overview
- Status: Proposed
- Owner: Government of the State of Nuevo León
- Locale: Monterrey
- Termini: Santa Lucía; Estanzuela
- Stations: 13
- Website: https://www.nl.gob.mx/?P=metrorrey_principal

Service
- Type: Autonomous Rapid Transit; Guided bus Bi-articulated bus
- System: Metrorrey
- Operator: Sistema de Transporte Colectivo Metrorrey

History
- Opened: 31 August 2027

Technical
- Line length: 10.6 km (6.6 mi)
- Operating speed: 65 km/h (40 mph)
Route map

Metrorrey Line 5 was a proposed Metrorrey rapid transit line that would have connected the south of Monterrey with the center of Monterrey. The system was designed to be an Autonomous Rapid Transit (ART) line without rails or catenary and virtual semi-automatic guidance. Each vehicle would have a capacity of 300 passengers. It would have been an extension of approximately 10.6 kilometers. It would have connected with lines 4 and 6 at the Hospital de Ginecología station, connected to line 3 at the Santa Lucía station (in front of the High Specialty Medical Unit No. 23 of the Mexican Social Security Institute).

On 29 April 2022, the Government of the State of Nuevo León launched an international public tender for the construction of the line. Construction work is expected to begin in November 2024 and end on August 31, 2027, according to the secretary of mobility, Hernán Villarreal. Line 5 will have elevated, surface and hybrid sections. On 19 November 2024, the State Secretary of Mobility officially announced the cancellation of the line's construction. Authorities reported that the decision was made due to opposition from residents of neighborhoods in southern Monterrey.

== History ==
In late 2021, governor of Nuevo León Samuel García announced the construction of lines 4 and 5 of the Metrorrey, then reported through a video on his social networks the place where the new metro lines will pass. The first plan presented provided that line 5 would depart from the center of Monterrey to the Mederos colony in the south of the municipality, having an original length of 8.5 kilometres (5.3 mi). However, in the publication of the tender, the length was extended to 10.6 kilometres (6.6 mi) long.

=== Tendering process ===
On 9 September 2022, the technical openings were completed as part of the process of the international public tender, two consortia were registered to win the award of the construction of Lines 4, 5 and 6. One of the consortia is made up of the companies Mota-Engil Mexico and China Communications Construction Company, which also built a section of the Tren Maya. The other consortium consists of the companies Ferrovías del Bajío, Hercules Construcciones de Monterrey, Constructora Moyeda, Manufacturas Metálicas Ajax, Tordec, Inversiones Ferroviarias de México, Consega Diseño y Construcciones, and Vivienda y Construcciones.

On 15 September 2022 the economic proposals were submitted by both consortia and, in accordance with the timetable for the tender, on 23 September 2022 the final judgment was awarded to the winning consortium. During the presentation stage of economic proposals for construction, the Secretariat of Urban Mobility and Planning of Nuevo León rejected the proposal of the consortium composed of the Mexican companies Ferrovías del Bajío, Hércules Construcciones de Monterrey, Constructora Moyeda, Manufacturas Metálicas Ajax, Tordec, Inversiones Ferroviarias de México, Consega Diseño y Construcciones, and Vivienda y Construcciones. It was explained that in none of the above-mentioned contracts had the consortium built any light rail, metro, or monorail lines in the last 15 years. Similarly, they were made aware that braking traction systems and automatic driving systems have not been constructed or operated by any of the members of that consortium.

On 23 September 2022, the tender was awarded for the construction of lines 4, 5 and 6 of the Metro to the consortium formed by the Portuguese firm Mota-Engil de México and the Chinese CRRC Hong Kong. At a press conference, it was reported that CRRC will be the supplier of rolling stock, while Mota-Enegil will take care of the construction. The Secretary of Urban Mobility and Planning of Nuevo León Hernán Villarreal explained that the tender has two cost options and that both are profitable for the administration. If the 3 lines are raised, the amount will amount to 25.861 million pesos plus VAT. If line 5 is built at level, the cost would drop to 25.857 million pesos plus VAT. The consortium formed by Mota-Engil and CRRC will sign the contract on 26 September at 10:00, at the offices of the Legal Directorate of the Secretariat of Mobility and Urban Planning, located in the Administrative Tower. Regarding the possibility of building part of the transport system at the street level, during the reading of the failure of the SMPU-LPI-001-2022 tender it was specified that this topic will be defined in November 2024. The construction process began on 30 September 2022 for lines 4 and 6 being monorail type. A popular consultation will be held in November 2024 to determine whether Metrorrey Line 5 will be an elevated monorail or a rapid transit line at ground level.

=== Construction ===
On 30 June 2023, Governor Samuel García began the construction of Line 5. This line would be hybrid at level, with three elevated sections and will use electric trains with rubber wheels (Autonomous Rapid Transit), unlike lines 4 and 6, which will have a monorail. The governor explained that the Line 5 project is based on four main axes. The first is the installation of green corridors, the second is the increase of public transport, the third is to remove the transport of cargo from Avenida Garza Sada that does not have as its destination Monterrey, and finally, the construction of the necessary infrastructure for the Line itself is contemplated.

== Controversies ==
In the early 2022, following the announcement of the first master plan of the new lines of the Metrorrey, neighbors of southern Monterrey demonstrated against the construction of line 5 by considering that a high viaduct will be detrimental to this whole sector, demanding that the line should be underground. They argued that lanes would be reduced on Garza Sada Avenue, businesses with the works would be closed and, in addition, aesthetically, will impact the properties and surplus value. For this reason, on 15 February 2022 they protested in front of the Palace of Government, where they delivered a letter addressed to the governor of Nuevo León, Samuel García, to listen to them and build Line 5 underground. After this, the government of Nuevo León announced that they would include in the master plan Line 6 that would travel from the center of the municipality of Monterrey to the center of the municipality of Apodaca in case the construction of Line 5 was not possible. In August 2022, García warned the opponents that the work on Line 5 will be done, since in the last months of last year the support of the vast majority of the southern neighborhoods has been quite positive and encouraging. Hence, as García said, it is only necessary to wait for further information on the project and the initiative of its construction.

== See also ==
- Metrorrey
  - Metrorrey Line 1
  - Metrorrey Line 2
  - Metrorrey Line 3
  - Metrorrey Line 4
  - Metrorrey Line 6
- Ecovía
