= Félix U. Gómez metro station =

Monterrey metro station

Félix U. Gómez

General information
- Location: Monterrey; Nuevo León, Mexico
- Coordinates: 25°41′02″N 100°17′48″W
- Operator: STC Metrorrey

Construction
- Accessible: Yes

History
- Opened: 25 April 1991; 35 years ago

Services
Preceding station	Metrorrey	Following station
Del Golfo toward Talleres	Line 1	Arena Monterrey toward Exposición
Colonia Obrera toward General I. Zaragoza	Line 3	Metalúrgicos toward Hospital Metropolitano
Location

The Félix U. Gómez Station (Spanish: Estación Félix U. Gómez) is a station on Lines 1 and 3 of the Monterrey Metro. It is located in the intersection of Felix U. Gómez Avenue and Colon Avenue in Monterrey Centre. The station was opened on 25 April 1991 as part of the inaugural section of Line 1, going from San Bernabé to Exposición.

This station serves the northeast side of the downtown area and also the Terminal neighborhood (Colonia Terminal). It is accessible for people with disabilities.

This station is named after the Felix U. Gómez Avenue, and its logo represents a cannon, since Felix U. Gómez was a Mexican Military General and revolutionary.

This station also connects with the "MetroBus" system.
