= Unidad Modelo metro station =

Monterrey metro station

Unidad Modelo
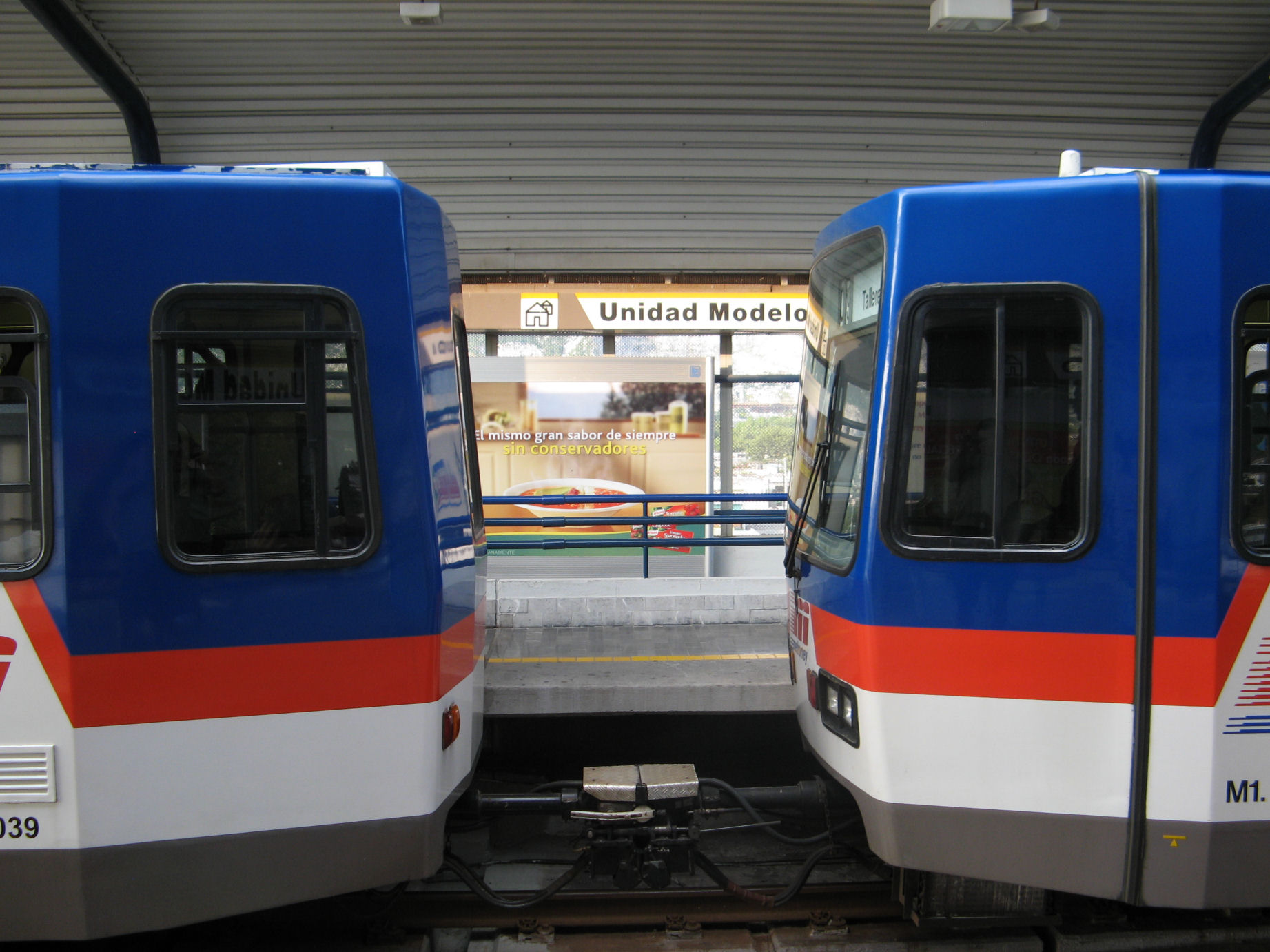

General information
- Location: Monterrey; Nuevo León, Mexico
- Coordinates: 25°44′31″N 100°21′18″W
- Operator: STC Metrorrey

Construction
- Accessible: Yes

History
- Opened: 25 April 1991; 35 years ago

Services
Preceding station	Metrorrey	Following station
San Bernabé toward Talleres	Line 1	Aztlán toward Exposición
Location

The Unidad Modelo Station (Spanish: Estación Unidad Modelo) is a station on Line 1 of the Monterrey Metro. It is located on Aztlán Avenue in Monterrey in the heart of the heavy populated Unidad Modelo neighborhood. This station is located in the Colon Avenue in the northeast side of the Monterrey Centre. The station was opened on 25 April 1991 as part of the inaugural section of Line 1, between San Bernabé and Exposición.

This station is accessible for people with disabilities.

The station is named after the neighborhood it is located in, and its logo represents the houses that are located in the zone.
