= Alfonso Reyes metro station =

Monterrey metro station

Alfonso Reyes
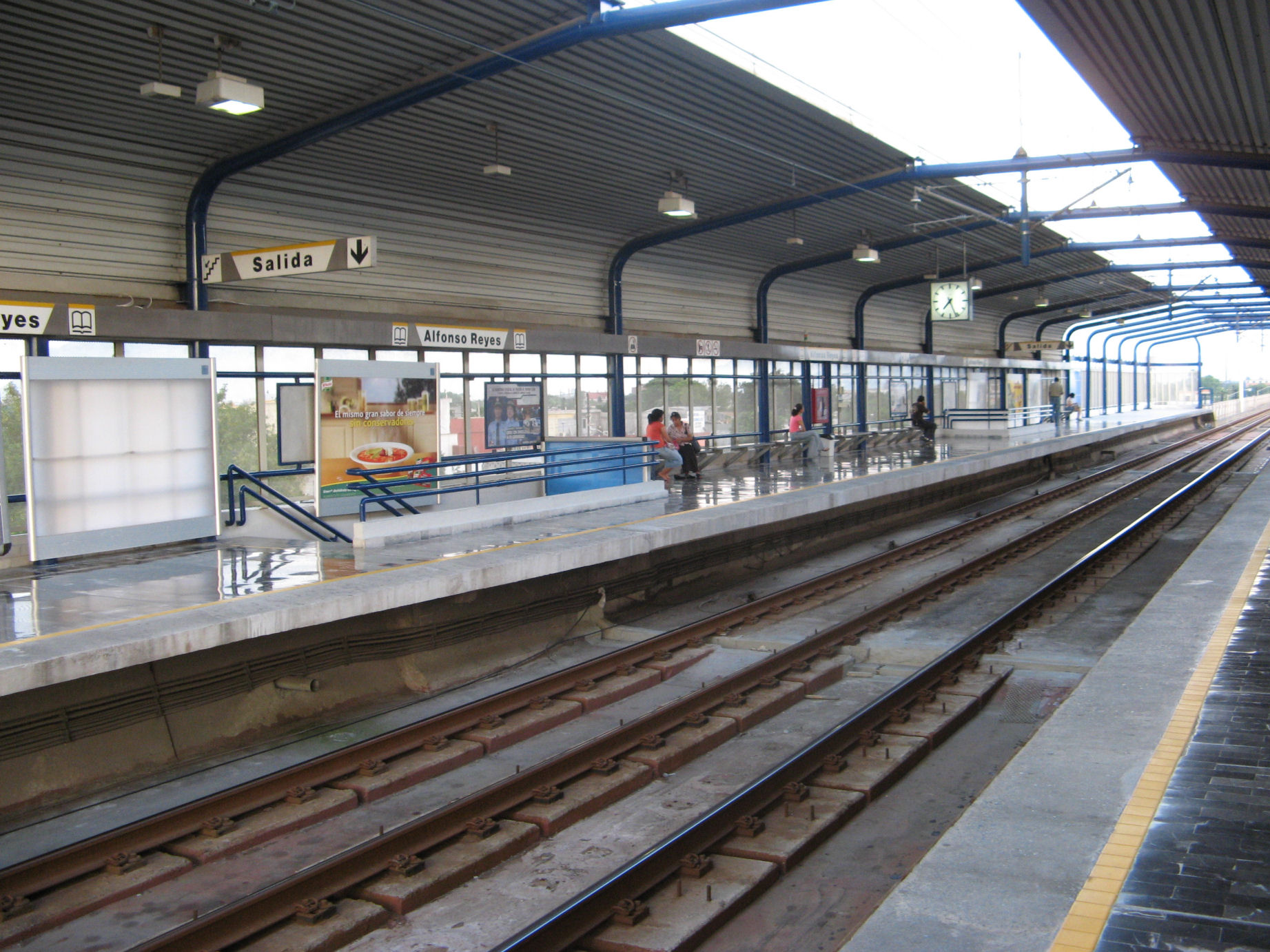

General information
- Location: Monterrey, Nuevo León; Mexico
- Coordinates: 25°42′58″N 100°20′33″W
- Operator: STC Metrorrey

Construction
- Accessible: Yes

History
- Opened: 25 April 1991; 35 years ago

Services
Preceding station	Metrorrey	Following station
Penitenciaría toward Talleres	Line 1	Mitras toward Exposición
Location

Alfonso Reyes Station (Spanish: Estación Alfonso Reyes) is a station on Line 1 of the Monterrey Metro in Monterrey, Mexico. It is located in the intersection of Rodrigo Gomez and Alfonso Reyes Avenues. This station is located in the Colon Avenue in the northeast side of the Monterrey Centre. The station was opened on 25 April 1991 as part of the inaugural section of Line 1, going from San Bernabé to Exposición.

This station serves the Nueva Morelos and Central neighborhoods (Colonias Nueva Morelos y Central). It is accessible for people with disabilities.

This station is named after Alfonso Reyes Avenue, and its logo represents a book since Alfonso Reyes was a great writer and whom the Avenue is named after.
