= Arena Monterrey metro station =

Monterrey metro station

Arena Monterrey

General information
- Location: Monterrey; Nuevo León, Mexico
- Coordinates: 25°41′01″N 100°17′17″W
- Operator: STC Metrorrey

Construction
- Accessible: Yes

History
- Opened: 25 April 1991; 35 years ago

Services
| Preceding station | Metrorrey | Following station |
|---|---|---|
| Félix U. Gómez toward Talleres | Line 1 | Y Griega toward Exposición |
Location

The Arena Monterrey Station (Spanish: Estación Arena Monterrey), formerly known as Parque Fundidora, is a station on Line 1 of the Monterrey Metro, Mexico. It is located in the intersection of Pablo A. de la Garza Avenue and Colon Avenue in the Pablo A. de la Garza neighborhood. The station was opened on 25 April 1991 as part of the inaugural section of Line 1, going from San Bernabé to Exposición.

This station serves the Pablo A. de la Garza and Acero neighborhoods (Colonias Pablo A. de la Garza y Acero), this station is important due to its proximity to the public Fundidora Park and the Monterrey Arena. It is accessible for people with disabilities.

This station was named for the nearby Fundidora Park (Parque Fundidora in Spanish), and its logo represented trees in a park. Now is named for the nearby Arena Monterrey.

On March 26th, 2026, the station was renamed as "Arena Monterrey", since "Parque Fundidora" will become a station to Line 6.
