= Y Griega metro station =

Monterrey metro station

Y Griega
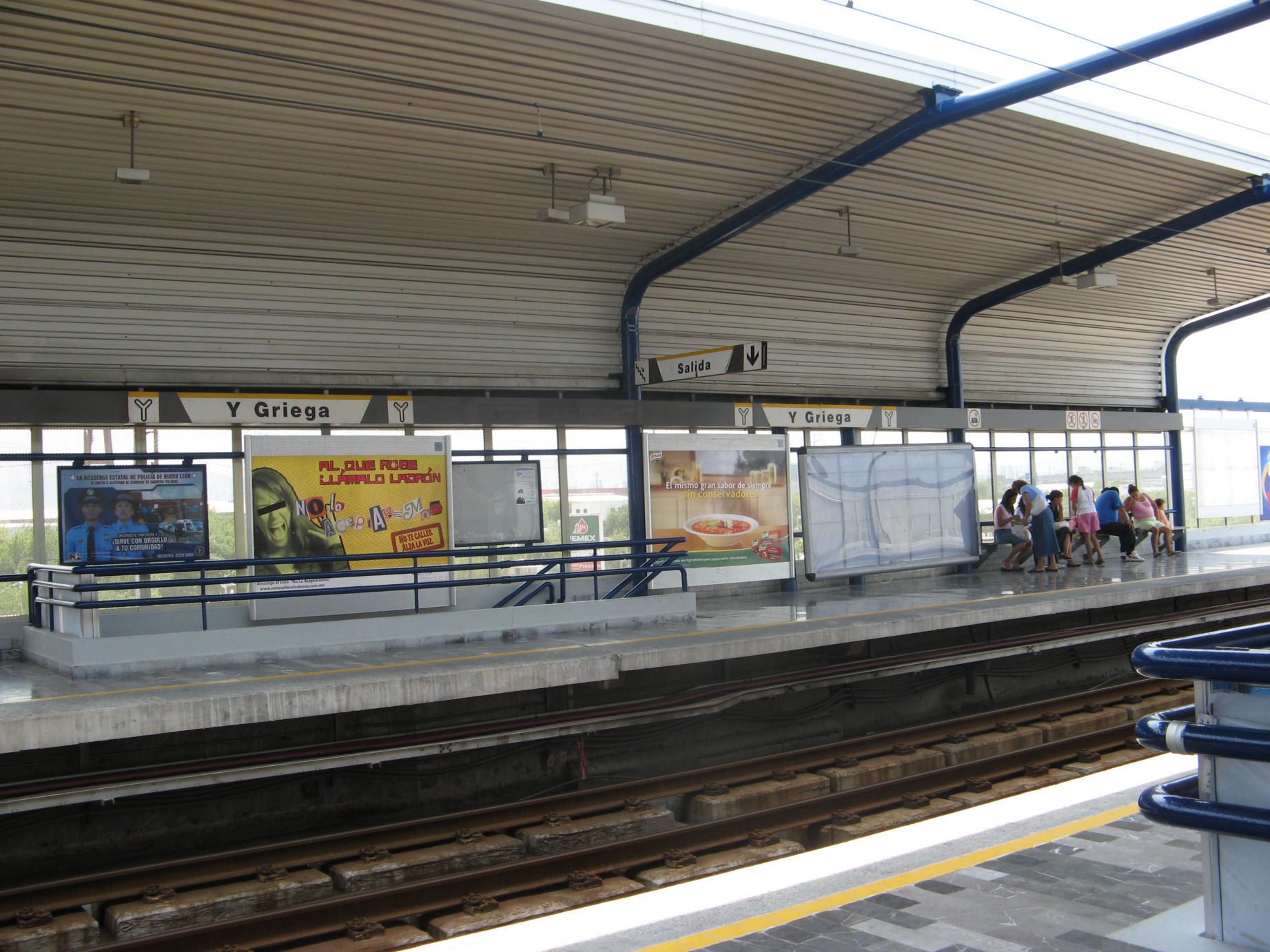

General information
- Location: Monterrey; Nuevo León, Mexico
- Coordinates: 25°41′00″N 100°16′46″W
- Operator: STC Metrorrey

History
- Opened: 25 April 1991; 35 years ago

Services
Preceding station	Metrorrey	Following station
Arena Monterrey toward Talleres	Line 1	Eloy Cavazos toward Exposición
Location

The Y Griega Station (Spanish: Estación Y Griega) is a station on Line 1 of the Monterrey Metro, a light rail system in Monterrey, Mexico. The station was opened on 25 April 1991 as part of the inaugural section of Line 1, going from San Bernabé to Exposición.

This station is named after the three-way junction that Avenues Colón and Madero make, and its logo represents it in the form of a letter "Y".

The Y Griega station is a major transfer station as many buses that service communities off the Metropolitan area such as Pesquería connect to the Metro system at the Y Griega station. A bus line operated by the Nuevo Leon State Government called the Ruta Express (Express Route) operates from this station to the airport. The Y Griega station also serves the Fundidora Park.

This station is in the Acero neighborhood (Colonia Acero) and it is close to Parque Fundidora.
