= Lerdo de Tejada (disambiguation) =

Sebastián Lerdo de Tejada was president of Mexico from 1872 to 1876.

Lerdo de Tejada may also refer to:

People

- Miguel Lerdo de Tejada (1812–1861), Mexican politician, elder brother of the above
- Miguel Lerdo de Tejada (composer) (1869–1941)

Places named for Sebastián Lerdo de Tejada

- Lerdo de Tejada, Veracruz, a city and municipality
- Lerdo de Tejada metro station, on the Monterrey Metro
