= Lerdo de Tejada metro station =

Monterrey metro station

Lerdo de Tejada
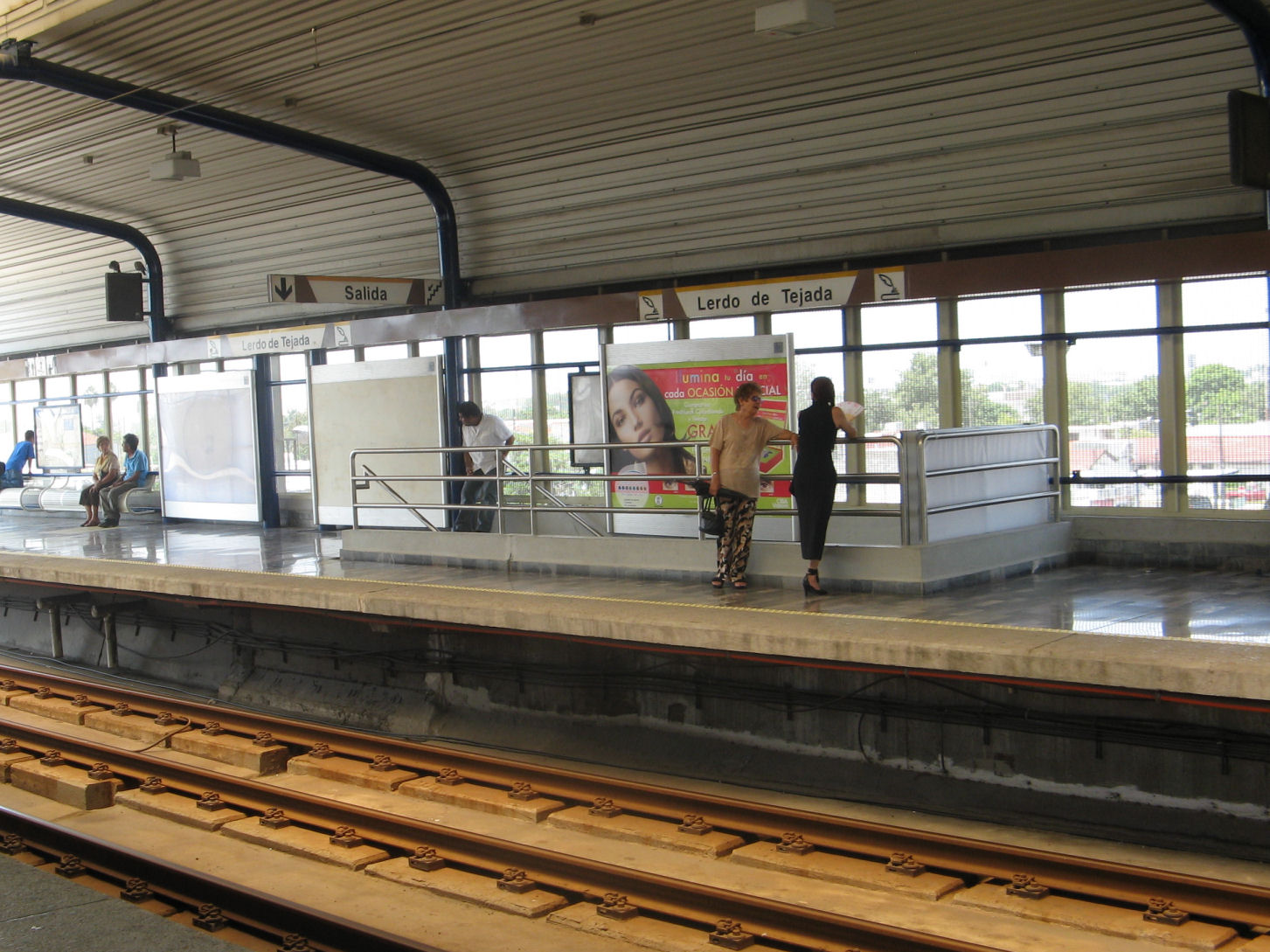

General information
- Location: Guadalupe; Nuevo León, Mexico
- Coordinates: 25°40′47″N 100°15′10″W
- Operator: STC Metrorrey

Construction
- Accessible: Yes

History
- Opened: 21 May 1995; 31 years ago

Services
Preceding station	Metrorrey	Following station
Eloy Cavazos toward Talleres	Line 1	Exposición Terminus
Location

Lerdo de Tejada Station (Spanish: Estación Lerdo de Tejada) is a station on Line 1 of the Monterrey Metro. It is located on Juárez and Lerdo de Tejada Avenues in Guadalupe, Nuevo León, Mexico.

This station serves the heavily populated Canteras neighborhood. It is near La Pastora Zoo Park. It is accessible to people with disabilities.

This station is named after Lerdo de Tejada Avenue, and its logo represents a quill since the street is named after Sebastian Lerdo de Tejada, a Mexican jurist, and former President of México.

This station was a ghost station for several years; it was opened to the public on May 21, 1995.
