= Alfonso Reyes (disambiguation) =

Alfonso Reyes (1889–1959) was a Mexican writer and diplomat.

Alfonso Reyes may also refer to:

- Alfonso Reyes Ramos (1913–1969), Mexican prelate, ordinary of the Roman Catholic Diocese of Ciudad Valles in 1966–1969
- Alfonso Reyes Echandía (1932–1985), Colombian jurist and Supreme Court justice
- Alfonso Reyes (basketball) (born 1971), Spanish basketball player

== See also ==
- Alfonso Reyes International Prize
- Alfonso Reyes metro station, Monterrey, Mexico
