= Talleres =

Talleres is a Spanish word meaning workshops, and may refer to:

- Talleres (Monterrey Metro), a metro station in Mexico
- Club Atlético Talleres (Córdoba), an Argentine association football club
- Club Atlético Talleres de Perico, an Argentine association football club
- Club Atlético Talleres de Remedios de Escalada, an Argentine association football club
