= Tren Suburbano de Monterrey =

Rail line in Nuevo León, Mexico

Overview
- Service type: Commuter rail
- Status: Proposed
- Locale: Monterrey metropolitan area
- First service: TBD
- Ridership: 850,000 potential users
- Website: https://www.fideproesnl.gob.mx/?dt_portfolio=tren_suburbano

Route
- Termini: Monterrey International Airport; García, Nuevo León
- Stops: 26
- Distance travelled: 62 km (39 mi)
- Line(s) used: Adjacent to KCSM/CPKC Line F

Technical
- Track gauge: 1,435 mm (4 ft 8 1/2 in)
- Operating speed: 100 km/h (62 mph) (maximum); 50–60 km/h (31–37 mph)

The Tren Suburbano de Monterrey (English: Monterrey Suburban Train) is a future commuter rail line in Monterrey, Nuevo León, Mexico. The cost of the project will be 12 billion pesos, Phase 1, of which 3 billion come from the federal government of Mexico, via Fonadin, another 3 billion via Banobras and 6 billion from the private initiative, under a private-public association scheme. Samuel García clarified that in 2022 they intend to start with the technical studies of the project themselves that will cost up to 500 million pesos.

== History ==
=== Origins ===
In 2005, José Eduardo Siller Aguirre, CEO of the company Ferromuro Integral Internacional, began making proposals for a suburban train in Monterrey.

In 2010, the suburban train project was submitted to the state administration, which showed interest and at its request deepened the relevant studies to prototype and design even more.

In 2019, the federal government and the government of Nuevo León signed an agreement to strengthen the mobility of the state by building 100 kilometers of tracks for the García-Airport Suburban Train.

The agreement involves releasing 172 kilometers of railroad tracks from freight trains, enabling the construction of a light passenger train that, in its first stage, would go from Monterrey International Airport to the municipality of García, whose investment would be at 13 billion pesos.

This route would have a route of 62 kilometers and will cross the municipalities of Apodaca, Monterrey, San Nicolás de los Garza, San Pedro Garza García, Santa Catarina and García. This project was originally planned with 22 intermediate stations, two terminals and three intermodal stations. It would connect with the Ecovía and Metrorrey Lines 1 and 2.

According to the Secretariat of Communications and Transport (SCT), it could serve 850,000 passengers and would serve part of the 11 million that use Monterrey airport each year.

A year later, in March 2020, the suburban train project was presented to the Mexican Institute of Intellectual Property (IMPI) making requests for an administrative declaration of trade infringement against the Governor of Nuevo León, the Secretary of Sustainable Development of the State of Nuevo León and the Director General of the Metrorrey Collective Transport System. On November 20, 2021, the new Governor of Nuevo León, Samuel García, cut the project of the suburban train, arguing that it would only be a first stage that would be in Monterrey; however, he argued that it would not be expanded to García because "this was an occurrence of El Bronco, because it is not sufficiently populated to give the capacity".Although the project to build the suburban train was approved by the Federal Government by President Andrés Manuel López Obrador, in the last months of 2021, from 2022 the plans to build the project changed by the State Government. In April 2022, the state administration announced its interest in reviving the construction of the Tren Suburbano, although the original project, signed in 2019, had a route of 62 kilometers and the one that was announced in 2022 was only 29 kilometers.

Initially, it was envisaged that the Tren Suburbano would reach Apodaca, but García, said that the necessary adjustments were made to achieve the extension to the municipality of Pesquería and thus benefit those who come to work at industrial plants in the region.

=== Preparation for construction ===
On 17 September 2023, it was reported that the Tren Suburbano had been replaced by metro extensions. However, on 13 December, it was announced that the Tren Suburbano de Monterrey will be built, and the Secretariat of Infrastructure, Communications and Transport, the government of Nuevo León, and Kansas City Southern de México (the operator of the tracks; a subsidiary of Canadian Pacific Kansas City) will be in charge of construction. The line will have a length of 75.23 km (46.75 mi), and part of it will be built adjacent to Line F (Spanish: Linea F), CPKC's freight rail line connecting Monterrey and Matamoros with the Mexico–United States border. It will have 26 stations, and serve the municipalities of García, Santa Catarina, San Pedro Garza García, Monterrey, San Nicolás de los Garza, Apodaca and Pesquería. The line will have a top speed of 100 km/h (62 mph), although the average speed will be 50–60 km/h (31–37 mph). The federal government of Mexico allocated MX$26,649,855.01 (US$1314743.71) to the project, while the State of Nuevo León requested that Banobras fund 50% of the money needed for studies and "advice of the work".

Later, on 28 May 2024, it was announced that the Tren Suburbano de Monterrey will consist of 62 km (39 mi) of track, that will connect Mariano Escobedo Airport with García, Nuevo León. It is expected that 850 thousand potential users, as well as "approximately 11 million passengers per year using the airport", will benefit from the train.
