= Metrorrey Line 3 =

Line 3

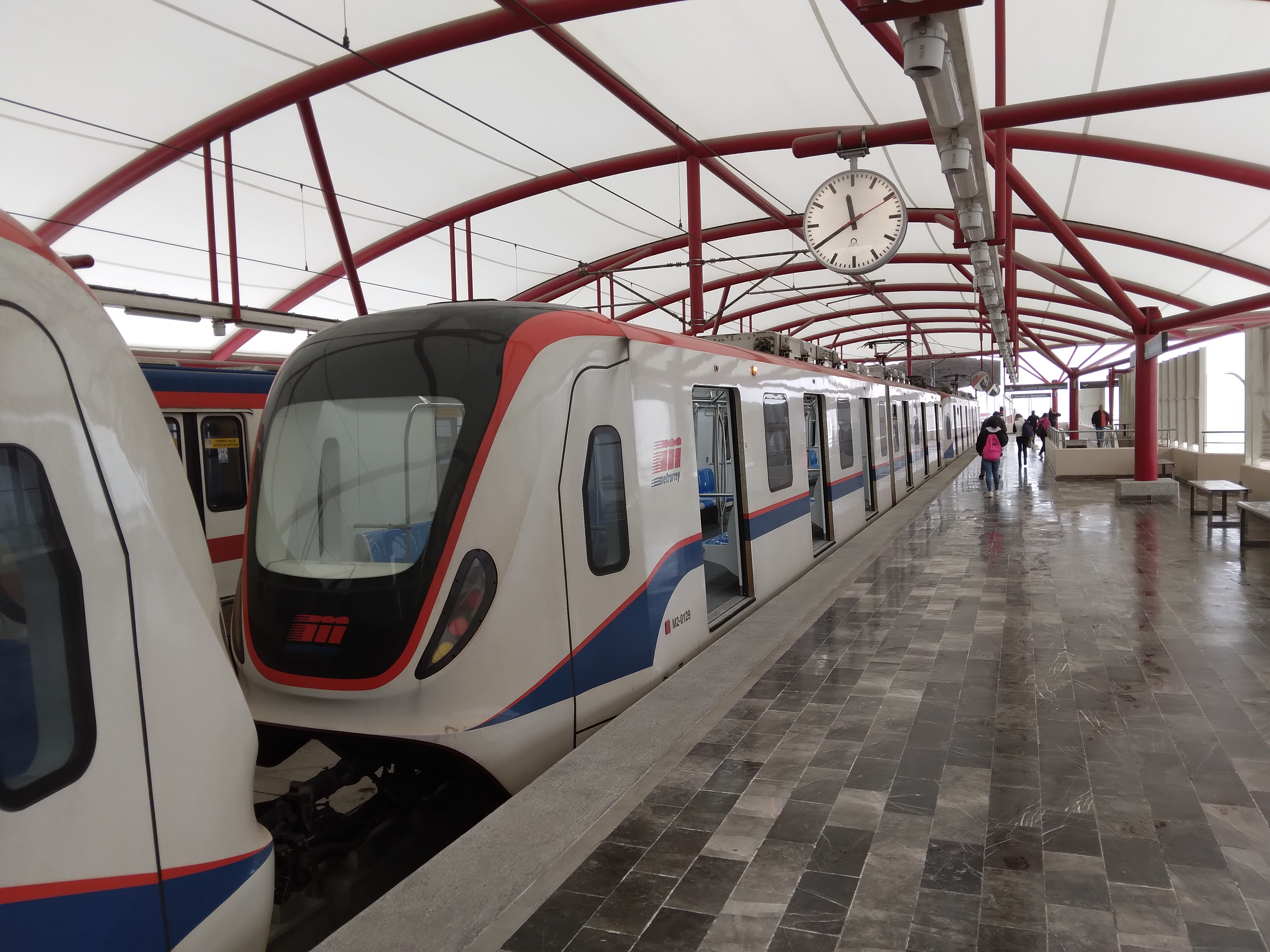
- Hospital Metropolitano metro station

Overview
- Status: Operational
- Locale: Monterrey
- Termini: Hospital Metropolitano; Zaragoza (Line 2)
- Stations: 8

Service
- Type: Rapid transit
- System: Metrorrey
- Operator(s): Sistema de Transporte Colectivo Metrorrey

History
- Opened: 27 February 2021; 5 years ago

Technical
- Line length: 7.5 km (4.7 mi)
- Track gauge: 1,435 mm (4 ft 8 1/2 in)

Line 3 is a line on the Metrorrey system. It has 8 stations and is 7.5 km (4.7 mi) long. The line opened on February 27, 2021.

== History ==
Construction for line 3 started in 2013. In early 2018, the state of Nuevo León signed a funding agreement to provide 600 million pesos to Metrorrey for continued construction on Line 3. Up to that period, Metrorrey reported total expenditures on Line 3 of over 10 billion pesos. The transit agency claims it spent these funds for viaducts, and station features, such as awnings, elevators, and escalators. By January 2020, construction for Line 3 was complete, according to the Secretaría de Comunicaciones y Transportes (SCT), the federal transportation agency. However, state government officials state that service is not available because the rolling stock has not been delivered. At that time, the estimated delivery for twenty-six rail cars was December 2020. The line is underground and elevated. Some of the 26 railcars arrived and passed on track testing as of August 2020, though not all of the railcars had arrived at that time.

== Chronology ==
- February 27, 2021: from Hospital Metropolitano to Zaragoza on Line 2

== Station list ==
No.	Logo	Station	Date opened	Level	Transfer(s)	Location
01		Hospital Metropolitano	February 27, 2021	Elevated		San Nicolás de los Garza
02		Los Ángeles	February 27, 2021	Elevated		Monterrey
03		Ruiz Cortines	February 27, 2021	Elevated		Monterrey
04		Colonia Moderna	February 27, 2021	Elevated		Monterrey
05		Metalúrgicos	February 27, 2021	Elevated		Monterrey
06		Félix U. Gómez	February 27, 2021	Elevated	Metro Line 1	Monterrey
07		Colonia Obrera	February 27, 2021	Elevated		Monterrey
08		Santa Lucía	February 27, 2021	Elevated		Monterrey
⇵		through service into Metro Line 2 via Zaragoza				Monterrey
