= Metrorrey Line 1 =

Line 1

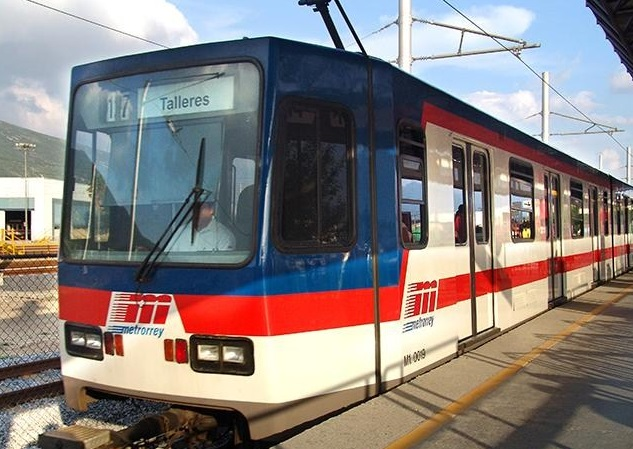
- Train at Talleres station.

Overview
- Status: Operational
- Locale: Monterrey
- Termini: Talleres; Exposición
- Stations: 19

Service
- Type: Rapid transit
- System: Metrorrey
- Operator(s): Sistema de Transporte Colectivo Metrorrey

History
- Opened: 25 April 1991; 35 years ago
- Last extension: 2002

Technical
- Line length: 18.828 km (11.699 mi)
- Track gauge: 1,435 mm (4 ft 8 1/2 in)

Line 1 is a line on the Metrorrey system. It has 19 stations and it runs 18.828 km (11.699 mi) from Talleres to Exposición. The line opened on 25 April 1991.

== History ==
Construction for Line 1 began on 18 April 1988 and it opened three years later on April 25, 1991, from Exposición to San Bernabé. On 11 June 2002, a new station on the line was opened: Talleres, replacing San Bernabé station as the northern terminus of the line.

== Chronology ==
- 25 April 1991: from Exposición to San Bernabé
- 11 June 2002: from San Bernabé to Talleres

== Stations ==
Logo	Station	Opened	Level	Interchanges	Municipality
	Talleres	11 June 2002	Surface	Transmetro Routes: No Reelección, Cabezada - Alianza, Julio A. Roca	Monterrey
	San Bernabé	25 April 1991	Elevated		Monterrey
	Unidad Modelo	25 April 1991	Elevated		Monterrey
	Aztlán	25 April 1991	Elevated		Monterrey
	Penitenciaría	25 April 1991	Elevated		Monterrey
	Alfonso Reyes	25 April 1991	Elevated		Monterrey
	Mitras	25 April 1991	Elevated	Ecovía	Monterrey
	Simón Bolívar	25 April 1991	Elevated		Monterrey
	Hospital	25 April 1991	Elevated		Monterrey
	Edison	25 April 1991	Elevated		Monterrey
	Central	25 April 1991	Elevated		Monterrey
	Cuauhtémoc	25 April 1991	Elevated	Monterrey's Metrorrey metro system Metrorrey Line 2	Monterrey
	Del Golfo	25 April 1991	Elevated		Monterrey
	Felix U. Gómez	25 April 1991	Elevated	Monterrey's Metrorrey metro system Metrorrey Line 3	Monterrey
	Arena Monterrey	25 April 1991	Elevated	Transmetro Route: Macroplaza - Fundidora	Monterrey
	Y Griega	25 April 1991	Elevated	Express Route: Aeropuerto - Y Griega	Monterrey
	Eloy Cavazos	25 April 1991	Elevated		Guadalupe
	Lerdo de Tejada	21 May 1995	Elevated		Guadalupe
	Exposición	25 April 1991	Elevated	Transmetro Route: Exposición - México	Guadalupe
