= TransMetro García–Monterrey–Guadalupe =

Mexican bus transit service

Ecovía
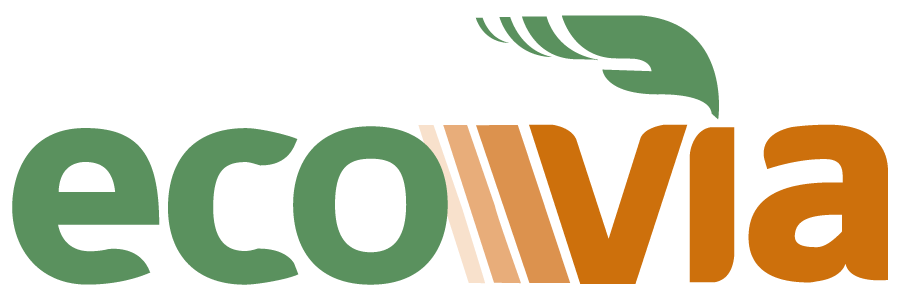

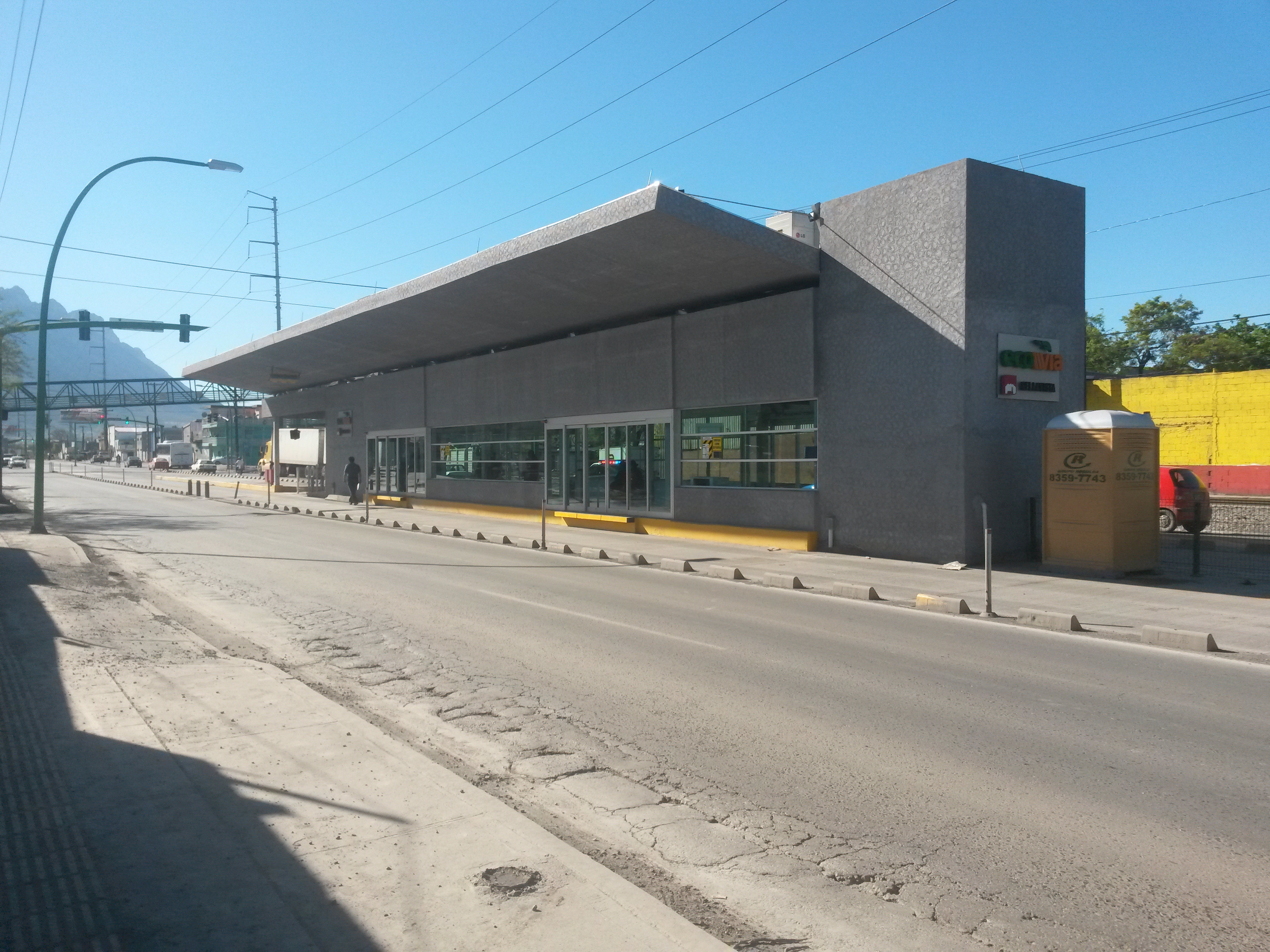
- Bella Vista station

Overview
- Owner: Gobierno del Estado de Nuevo León
- Area served: Monterrey metropolitan area
- Locale: Monterrey
- Transit type: Bus rapid transit
- Number of lines: 1
- Number of stations: 40
- Website: http://ecovia.nl.gob.mx/

Operation
- Began operation: 28 January 2014 (12 years)

Technical
- System length: 30.1 km (18.7 mi)

TransMetro García–Monterrey–Guadalupe is a line of TransMetro (a subsidiary of Metrorrey), a bus rapid transit (BRT) system in Monterrey, Nuevo Leon that began operations in January 2014 as the Ecovía system.

== Overview ==
The line runs over 30 kilometers, serving three different municipalities of the Monterrey Metropolitan area: Monterrey, San Nicolas and Guadalupe.

Ecovía buses operate within a fully dedicated right of way (busway). Buses offer free wifi access.

Ecovía stations include off-board fare collection and platform level with the bus floor.

== See also ==
- List of bus rapid transit systems
- Metrorrey
