= Metrorrey =

Light rapid transit system in Monterrey, Mexico

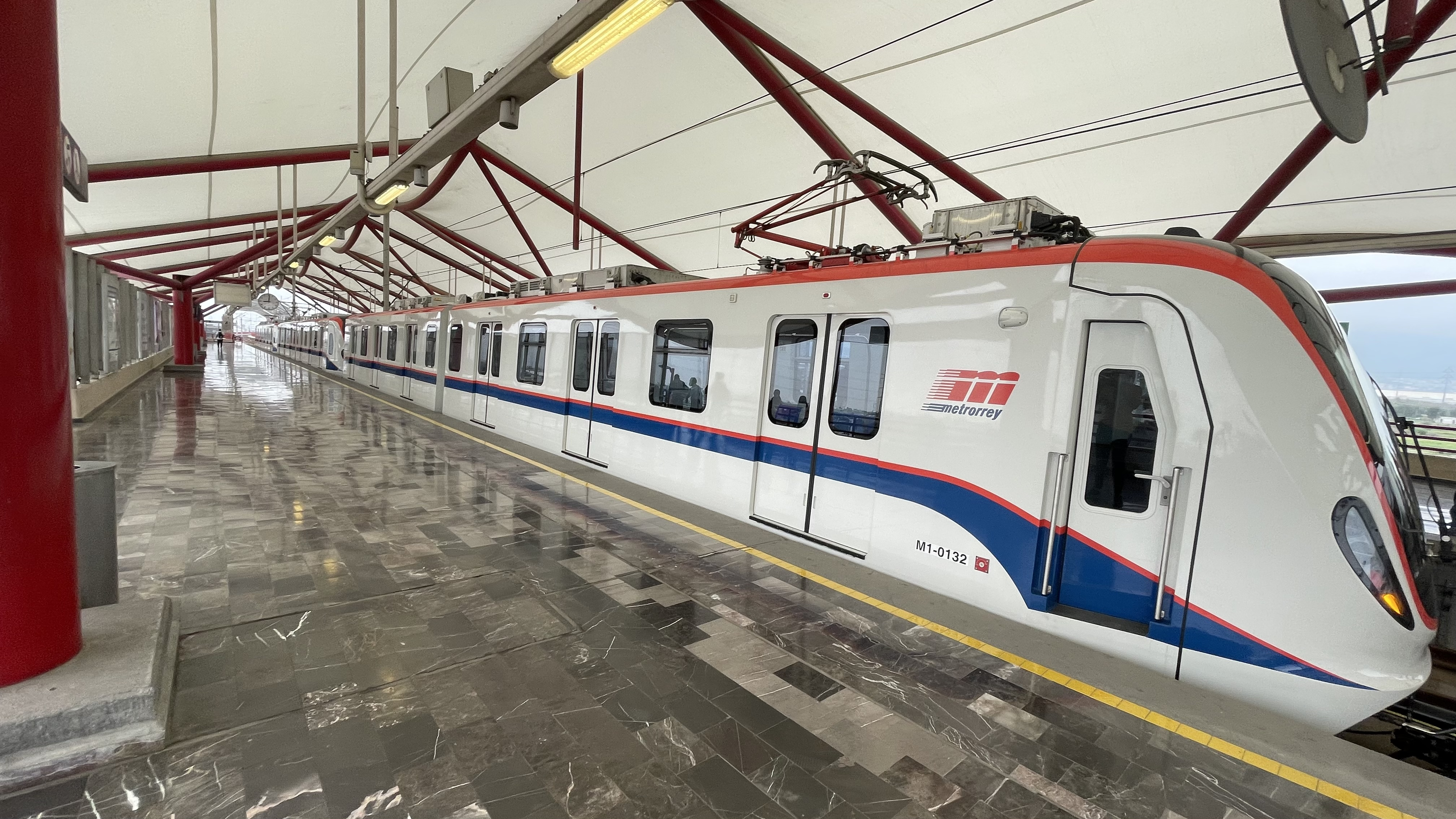
- Train arriving at Sendero metro station

Overview
- Native name: Sistema de Transporte Colectivo Metrorrey
- Owner: Nuevo León state government
- Locale: Monterrey, Nuevo León, México
- Transit type: Light metro
- Number of lines: 3
- Number of stations: 40
- Daily ridership: 266,000 (2025)
- Annual ridership: 97.09 million (2025)
- Website: STC Metrorrey

Operation
- Began operation: April 21, 1991; 35 years ago
- Operator: Sistema de Transporte Colectivo Metrorrey
- Character: Elevated and underground
- Number of vehicles: 134
- Train length: 2-3 cars

Technical
- System length: 40 km (25 mi)
- Track gauge: 1,435 mm (4 ft 8 1/2 in)
- Electrification: Overhead line, 1,500 V DC
- Top speed: 80 km/h (50 mph)

Metrorrey, officially Sistema de Transporte Colectivo Metrorrey, is a rapid transit system that serves the metropolitan area of Monterrey. It is operated by the Sistema de Transporte Colectivo Metrorrey, which is part of the decentralized public administration of Nuevo León. In 2022, it was the sixth largest metro system in North America by ridership.

The inaugural line opened to the public on 25 April 1991 and served 17 stations. The system has since expanded. As of 2024, the system operates 50 high-floor electric trains along 3 lines, serving 40 stations with a route of 40 kilometers (25 mi).

== Operations ==
=== Lines ===
The Metrorrey has three lines with 40 stations.

==== Line 1 ====
Line 1 opened on April 25 of 1991 and has 19 stations, it runs through the center of the city from the north-west to the eastern part of the Monterrey metropolitan area. Built as an 18.5 km (11.5 mi) long line, it runs parallel to the former 1887 Topo Chico tramline and is grade-separated as it runs on an elevated structure. A complete ride along this line takes about 27 minutes.

==== Line 2 ====
Line 2 has 13 stations and is 13 km (8.1 mi) long, it is also fully grade-separated, partially on an elevated structure and partially underground, running from the center of the city towards the north. The first 4.5 km (2.8 mi) long underground segment opened on November 30 of 1994 with 6 stations, with the possibility of transferring to Line 1 at Cuauhtémoc station. In 2005 construction began on an expansion to the line with a total investment of US$200 million. Said expansion comprised 2 phases, the first one being 3.2 km (2.0 mi) (1.5 km (0.93 mi) of it underground) long, it opened on October 31 of 2007 adding 3 more stations to the line. The second phase added another 5.3 km (3.3 mi) of elevated railway along the center of the Universidad avenue and 4 more stations, it was inaugurated on October 9 of 2008 by Nuevo León Governor Natividad González Parás and Mexican president Felipe Calderón.

==== Line 3 ====
Line 3 has 8 stations and is 7.5 km (4.7 mi) long, it is grade-separated and runs mostly on an elevated structure, except the southern end section that connects with Line 2 at Zaragoza station. The two lines are operated jointly. Construction of Line 3 started in 2013 and was completed by January 2020, but the rolling stock had not been delivered; at that time, the estimated delivery for twenty-six rail cars was December 2020. It was eventually inaugurated on February 27, 2021 by Nuevo León Governor Jaime Rodríguez Calderón.

== Network ==
Map of Metrorrey towards 2027, including lines currently under construction (lines 4, 5 and 6).

Metrorrey shares characteristics with both a light rail system and a metro system. It utilizes high-floor light rail vehicles, similar to light rail systems, while also operating on a fully grade separated exclusive right-of-way with high passenger volumes, similar to a metro system.

The network primarily operates above-ground, with most of its sections on elevated railway viaducts: of its forty stations, thirty-two are elevated, seven are underground, and one is on the surface. Most of the elevated portions of the network are built along an avenue's median and follow the avenue's path. The underground portions of Lines 2 and 3 also follow the routes of the streets above.

Metrorrey is made up of a variety of different train systems. Lines 1, 2, and 3 are designed as light rail systems, Lines 4 and 6 are designed as monorails, and Line 5 is designed as an Autonomous Rail Rapid Transit system.

=== Hours of operation ===
On all lines, the first train leaves each terminus station at 5:00 a.m. and the last train leaves at 11:30 p.m., with the network remaining in operation until midnight. Stations open at 4:45 a.m.

On Christmas Eve and New Year's Eve, services end at 11.00 p.m., and on Christmas and New Year's Day, services start at 7.00 a.m. During events in Fundidora Park, like Pal Norte, stations Y Griega and Parque Fundidora remain open until 3:00 a.m, with other stations open solely for disembarking.

=== Fares and payment methods ===
Payment methods include the Me Muevo and Mia NFC cards, QR codes generated by the Urbani or E-UANL apps, and Spin by Oxxo contactless debit cards. The NFC cards can be bought for MXN $20.00 at automated machines and can be recharged to a maximum of MXN $500.00.

As of April 2024, a single trip costs MXN $7.70 and allows a rider one trip anywhere within the system with unlimited transfers. This ticket also allows transfers to Ecovía services at Mitras station. A Tarifa Integrada (in English: "integrated fare") costs MXN $15.00, which includes up to two transfers between the TransMetro bus system and the Metrorrey system within two hours from the first validation.

A discounted rate of MXN $3.00 for single trips is available for the elderly. UANL students, via the E-UANL app, have access to a discounted rate of MXN $7.50 for single trips and MXN $9.50 for the Tarifa Integrada.

=== Transfers to other systems ===
==== TransMetro ====
Metrorrey has a bus system called TransMetro. This system uses integrated fares, called a Tarifa Integrada, which costs MXN $15.00 and allows up to two transfers between the bus system and Metrorrey.

TransMetro routes typically pass by or start at Metrorrey stations: eleven routes start in Line 1 (three in Talleres, one in Mitras, one in Cuauhtémoc, one in Félix U. Gómez, two in Y Greiga, and three in Exposición), twelve routes in Line 2 (eight in Sendero and four in Universidad), and six routes in Line 3 (all start at Hospital Metropolitano).

==== Ecovía ====
Metrorrey has one integrated connection with the Ecovía bus rapid transit system, located in Line 1's Mitras station, allowing users to transfer between both systems at no cost. Line 3 has a connection with Ecovía at Ruiz Cortines station; however, unlike Line 1's connection, this one requires users to exit the station, meaning that a fare must be paid when transferring.

=== Rolling stock ===
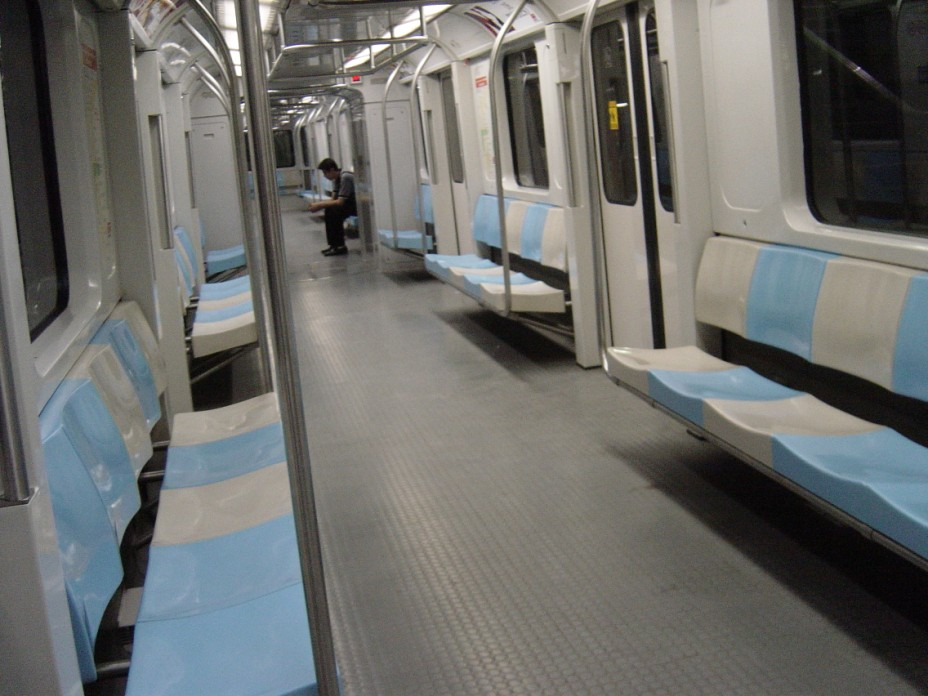
Interior of an MM-93 train

The Metrorrey system uses 134 high-floor articulated vehicles. Five manufacturers have provided rolling stock for Metrorrey, these being Concarril (MM-90A), Bombardier (MM-90B and MM-05), CAF (MM-93), Duewag-Talbot (MM-U3), and CRRC (MM-20 and MM-24). MM-U3 is the only type of vehicle that was refurbished: they were originally Frankfurt U-Bahn Type U3 trains until 2017, and were refurbished by Talbot Services to extend their service life by 20 years.

All of the rolling stock has a maximum velocity of 80 km/h (50 mph). Their average velocity is 30 km/h (19 mph). There is air conditioning in the MM-93, MM-U3, MM-20, and MM-24 models.

The MM-90, MM-93, MM-05, and MM-20 models can be configured as four-car trains, while the MM-U3 model, due to its smaller size, can be configured as a five-car train. However, due to station platform sizes, three-car configurations are used for the MM-90, MM-93, MM-05, and MM-20 models, and four-car configurations are used for the MM-U3 model.

Model	Image	Manufacturer	Capacity	Fleet size
MM-90A		Concarril	300	25
MM-90B		Bombardier	300	23
MM-93		CAF	300	22
MM-05		Bombardier	300	14
MM-U3		Duewag-Talbot	260	24
MM-20		CRRC	300	26
MM-24		CRRC	300	4
MM-25		CRRC	300	18

== Lines ==
Annual ridership of Metorrey
Year	Ridership	% change
1995	36,934,000	—
1996	31,372,000	−15.06%
1997	34,606,000	+10.31%
1998	32,935,000	−4.83%
1999	36,077,000	+9.54%
2000	40,047,000	+11.00%
2001	45,456,000	+13.51%
2002	47,764,000	+5.08%
2003	51,678,000	+8.19%
2004	52,420,000	+1.44%
2005	57,287,000	+9.28%
2006	60,275,000	+5.22%
2007	66,019,000	+9.53%
2008	88,348,000	+33.82%
2009	136,620,000	+54.64%
2010	146,891,900	+7.52%
2011	152,995,700	+4.16%
2012	156,938,800	+2.58%
2013	168,271,300	+7.22%
2014	175,107,000	+4.06%
2015	79,929,500	−54.35%
2016	74,972,600	−6.20%
2017	75,026,100	+0.07%
2018	75,446,500	+0.56%
2019	78,750,800	+4.38%
2020	45,310,200	−42.46%
2021	51,354,000	+13.34%
2022	66,742,500	+29.97%
2023	68,763,600	+3.03%
2024	85,175,500	+23.87%
2025	97,097,100	+14.00%

According to Mexico's National Institute of Statistics, Geography and Informatics, Metrorrey's three lines transported about 97.09 million passengers in 2025, which corresponds to an average daily ridership of about 266,000 passengers. Each line has a number and color assigned to it. The network adopted the logo system of the Mexico City Metro, with the logo including an icon representing the station's surroundings and the line's corresponding color. Stations serving two or more lines show the respective colors of each line in diagonal stripes. The logos were updated in 2021.

Metrorrey lines
Line	Opened	Last extension	Stations served	Length	Termini	Transit type
Line 1	1991	2002	19	18.8 km (11.7 mi)	Talleres; Exposición	Light rail
Line 2	1994	2008	13	13.7 km (8.5 mi)	Sendero; General Zaragoza	Light rail
Line 3	2021	—N/a	8	7.5 km (4.7 mi)	Hospital Metropolitano; General Zaragoza	Light rail

=== Lines under construction ===
Throughout his campaign and in the first months of his term, Governor Samuel García pledged to substantially expand the Metrorrey network during his tenure. In November 2021, García unveiled the planned routes for Lines 4 and 5. The original plans for 13.5 km (8.4 mi)-long Line 4 would have connected the Western suburb of Santa Catarina with Downtown Monterrey, but have been cut back to end in the colony of San Jerónimo with an interchange to Tren Suburbano de Monterrey at Pedro G. García station, later named Tren el Norte station.

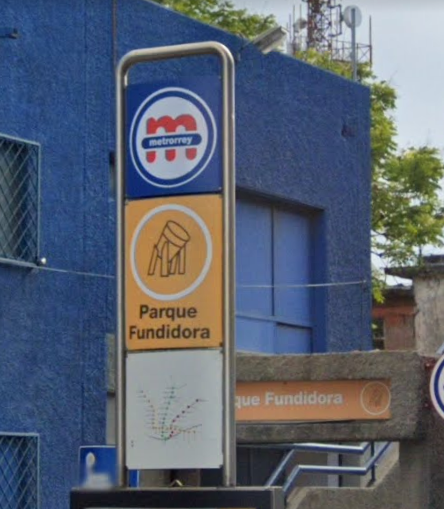
The logo for the former Parque Fundidora metro station (since March 2026 Arena Monterrey metro station). Since it is in Line 1, the logo's color is yellow.

García furthermore announced that the new lines will predominantly run on an elevated viaduct, which caused some backlash among neighbors in South Monterrey, with calls for an underground system. Line 6 was announced in the wake of this controversy. At 26.9 km (16.7 mi) long, it is expected to become the longest route in the system, connecting Downtown Monterrey with the suburb of Apodaca and the Monterrey International Airport.

In all, the expansion plans set forward by Governor García call for 34.4 kilometres (21.4 mi) of new track and 22 new stations built by 2027, nearly doubling the network's length and expanding the number of stations by half within six years. Line 4 have been started construction in spring 2023, at a cost of MXN$19 billion (US$1 billion). The cost for Line 6 has been estimated at MXN$26 billion (US$1.3 billion), with a start of construction in February 2023.

Metrorrey lines
Line	Construction start	Planned opening	Planned stations	Length	Termini	Transit type
Line 4	April 2023	June 2027	7	7.5 km (4.7 mi)	Ginecología; Tren del Norte	Monorail
Line 6	February 2023	2026 (First phase); 2027 (Second phase)	15	26.9 km (16.7 mi)	Ginecología; Aeropuerto	Monorail

=== Cancelled plans ===
Line 5 was one of the three Metrorrey rapid transit lines, which was originally planned as a monorail. After protests of the neighborhood population, plans were transformed into an Autonomous Rapid Transit (ART) line, that would have used electric transport vehicle without rails or catenary, but virtual semi-automatic guidance. Each vehicle would have had a capacity of 300 passengers. It would have had an extension of approximately 11.5 kilometers and wolud have followed a southern route towards the Carretera Nacional area. It should have connected to line 3 at the Santa Lucía station and with lines 4 and 6 at the (Hospital de) Ginecología station. On 19 November 2024, the State Secretary of Mobility officially announced the cancellation of the line's construction. Authorities reported that the decision was made due to opposition from residents of neighborhoods in southern Monterrey. In September 2026, the government revived the line as part of its vision for the future.

== See also ==
- List of metro systems
- List of Latin American rail transit systems by ridership
- Mexico City Metro
- Mexico City Light Rail
- Guadalajara light rail system
- Ecovía
