= San Bernabé metro station =

Monterrey metro station

San Bernabé
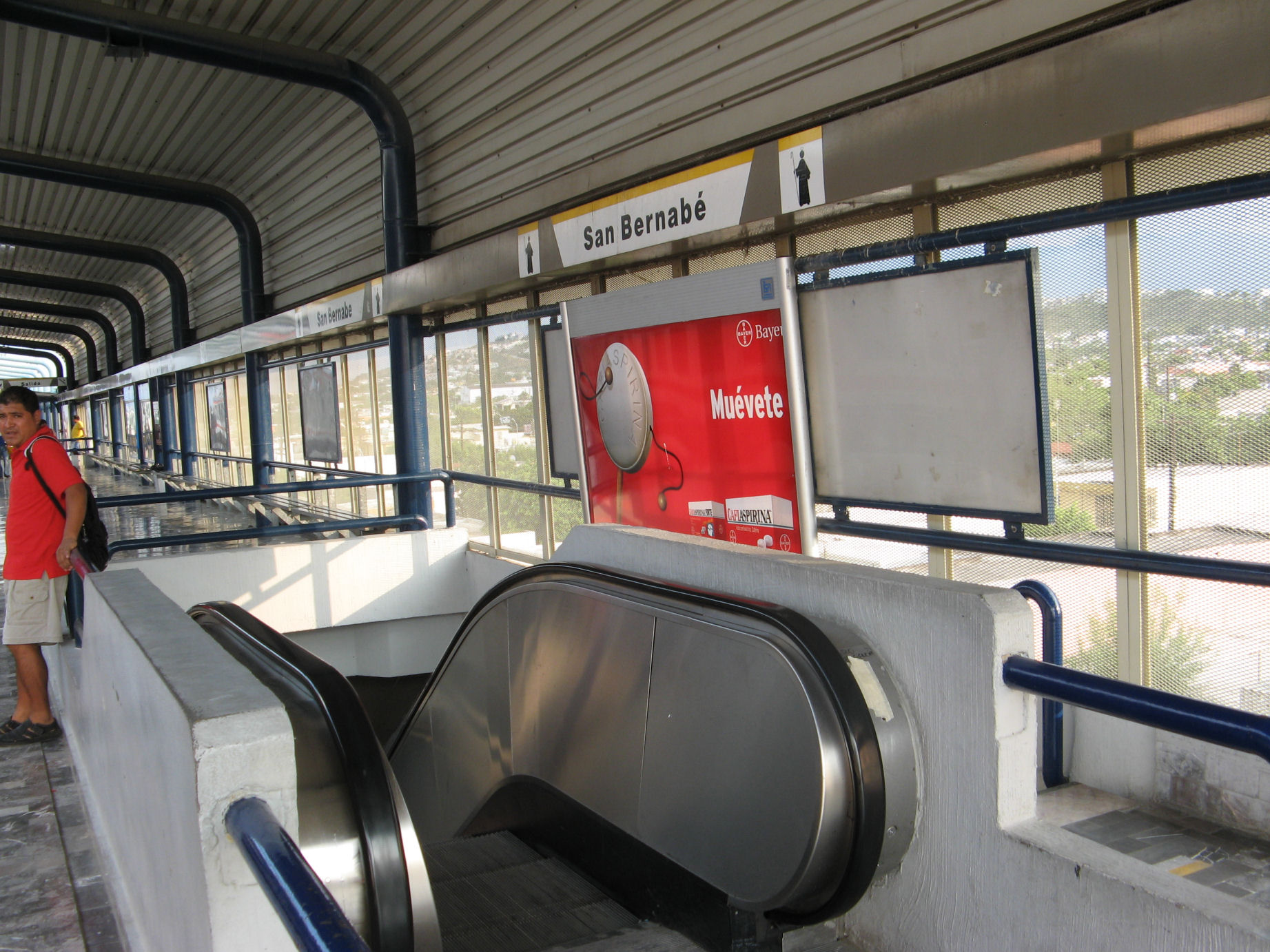

General information
- Location: Monterrey; Nuevo León, Mexico
- Coordinates: 25°44′54″N 100°21′42″W
- Operator: STC Metrorrey

History
- Opened: 21 April 1991; 35 years ago

Services
Preceding station	Metrorrey	Following station
Talleres Terminus	Line 1	Unidad Modelo toward Exposición
Location

The San Bernabé Station (Spanish: Estación San Bernabé) is a station on Line 1 of the Monterrey Metro. It is located in the Solidaridad Avenue and Lic Julio Camelo intersection in Monterrey. This station is located in the Colon Avenue in the northeast side of the Monterrey Centre. The station was opened on 25 April 1991 as the western terminus of the inaugural section of Line 1, between San Bernabé and Exposición. On 11 June 2003, the line was extended west to Talleres.

This station serves San Bernabé, Loma Linda and Valle de Santa Lucia. It is accessible for people with disabilities.

This station is named after the neighborhood in which is located (Colonia San Bernabé), and its logo represents the silhouette of San Bernabé, from which the zone is named after.
