= Exposición metro station =

Monterrey metro station

Exposición
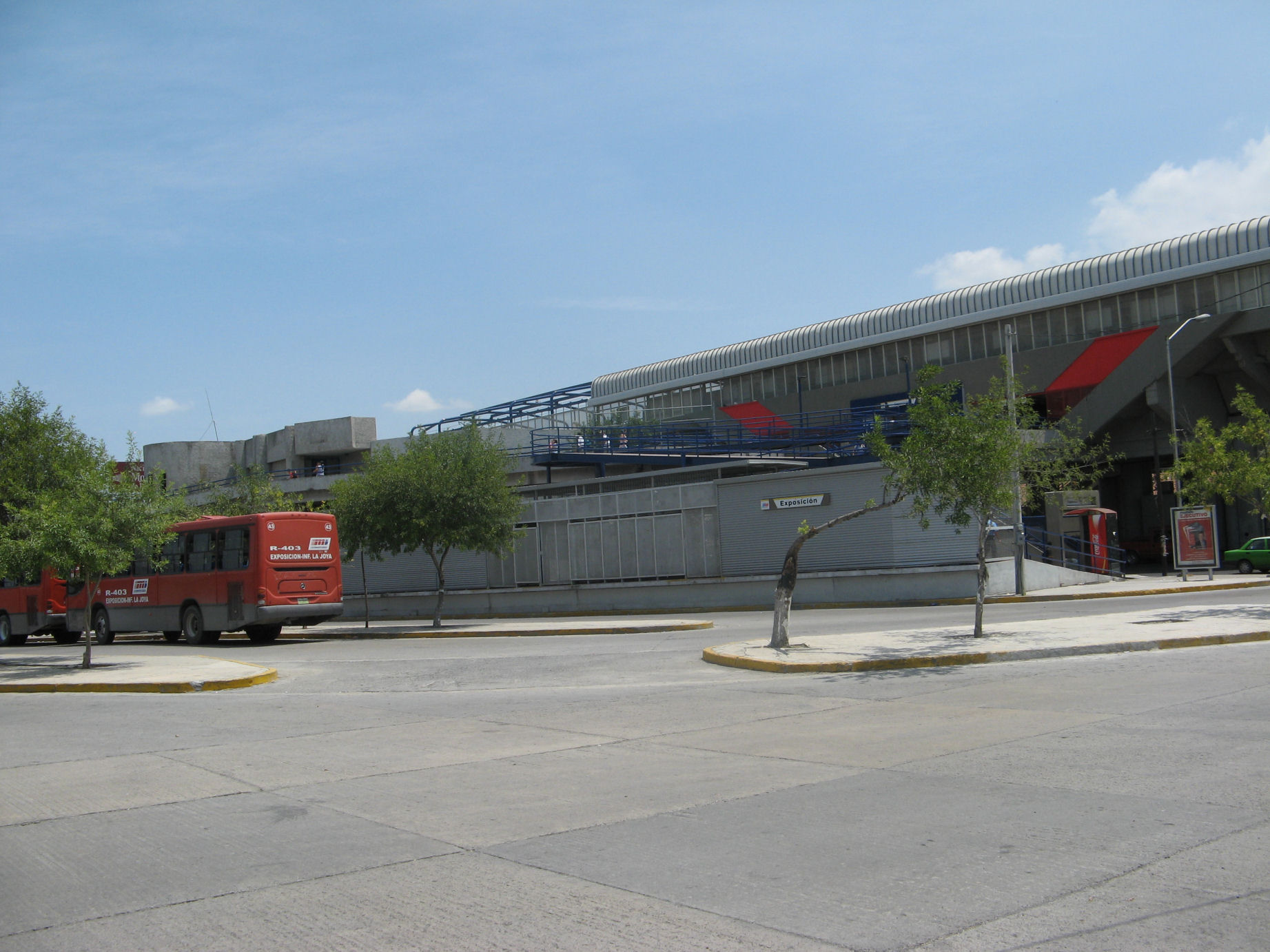

General information
- Location: Guadalupe; Nuevo León, Mexico
- Coordinates: 25°40′46″N 100°14′44″W
- Operator: STC Metrorrey

History
- Opened: 25 April 1991; 35 years ago

Services
Preceding station	Metrorrey	Following station
Lerdo de Tejada toward Talleres	Line 1	Terminus
Location

The Exposición Station (Spanish: Terminal Exposición) is a terminal station on Line 1 of the Monterrey Metro. It is located on Juárez and Exposición Avenues in the La Hacienda neighborhood in Guadalupe, Nuevo León, Mexico. The station was opened on 25 April 1991 as the eastern end point or terminus of the inaugural section of Line 1, going from San Bernabé to Exposición.

This station is named after the Cattle State Exposition Show grounds (Expo Ganadera de N.L.) that are located just beside the station, and its logo represents the head of a bovine.

This station is the eastern terminal of Line 1, and is multimodal: it connects with Metrobús lines that serve areas including Cadereyta and Cd. Benito Juarez and also with Transmetro (see below).

== Transmetro connection ==
One Transmetro route runs from this station from 6am until 10:30pm at intervals of 5–6 minutes:

Route	Comments	Map
México	11.20 km, 21.30 minutes of travel time, 18 stations.	Transmetro Exposición route map
