= Talleres metro station =

Monterrey metro station

Talleres
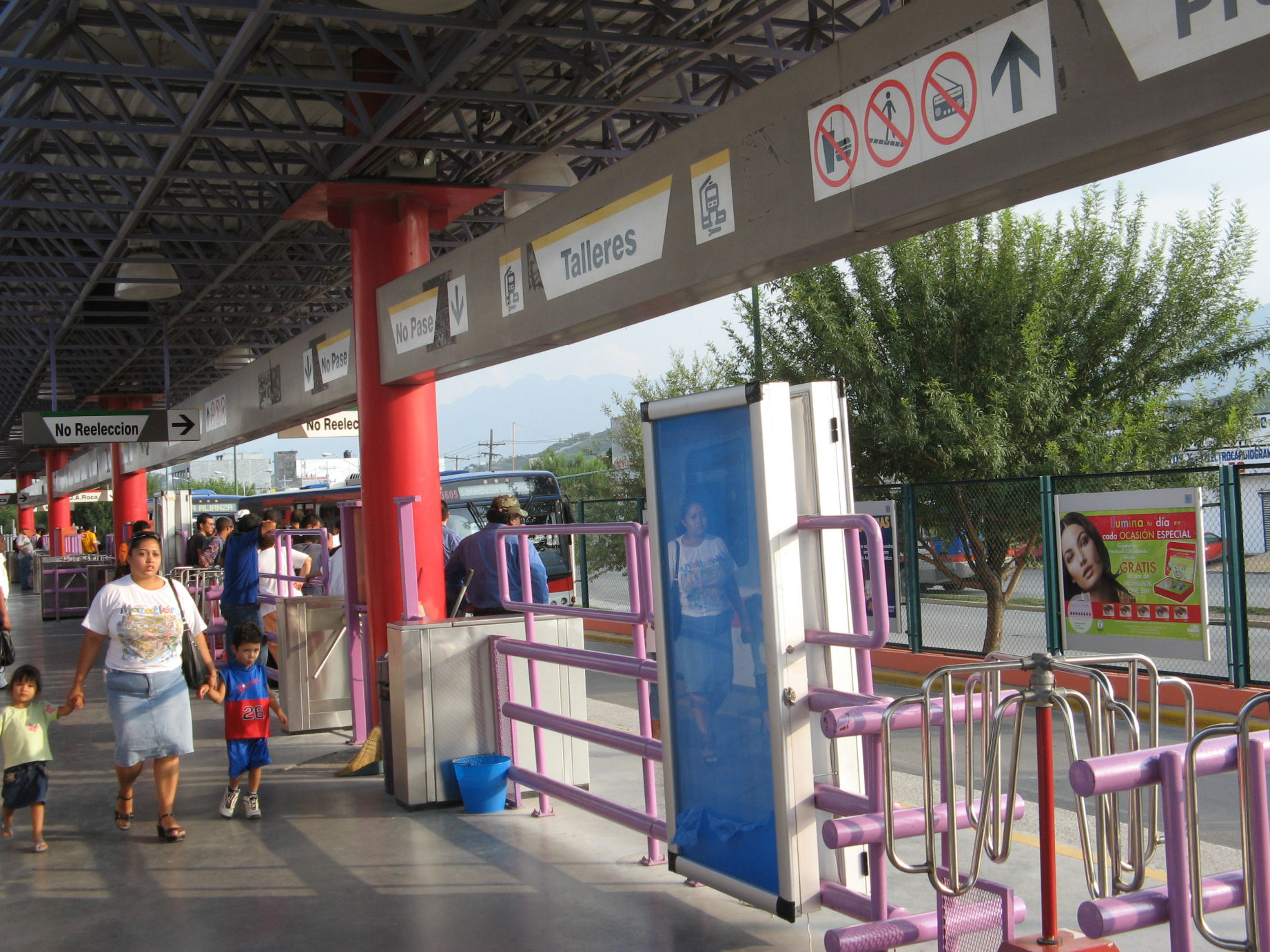

General information
- Location: Monterrey; Nuevo León, Mexico
- Coordinates: 25°45′14″N 100°21′55″W
- Operator: STC Metrorrey

History
- Opened: 11 June 2002; 24 years ago

Services
Preceding station	Metrorrey	Following station
Terminus	Line 1	San Bernabé toward Exposición
Location

Talleres Station (Spanish: Terminal Talleres) is a terminal station on Line 1 of the Monterrey Metro. It is located on Ave. Solidaridad and Esquisto St. in the San Bernabé VI neighborhood in Monterrey, Mexico.

This station is named after the Metrorrey maintenance shops (talleres) that are located right after the station, and its logo represents a train during maintenance.

Although this part of Line 1 was operational from the start, the original terminal of Line 1 was San Bernabé station. At that time the line from San Bernabé to Talleres was only used to get trains to the shops. It was not until June 11, 2002, that this portion of the line was opened for passenger service and Talleres became a station.

Unlike the rest of the stations in Line 1 of the Monterrey Metro, Talleres is accessed at ground level.

== Transmetro connections ==
Route	Comments	Map
No Reelección	5.20 km, 11.30 minutes of travel time, 9 stations.	
Cabezada - Alianza	10.7 km, 21 minutes of travel time, 17 stations.	
Julio A. Roca	5.78 km, 11 minutes of travel time, 9 stations.	
