= Plaza de los Mariachis =

Plaza in Guadalajara, Jalisco, Mexico

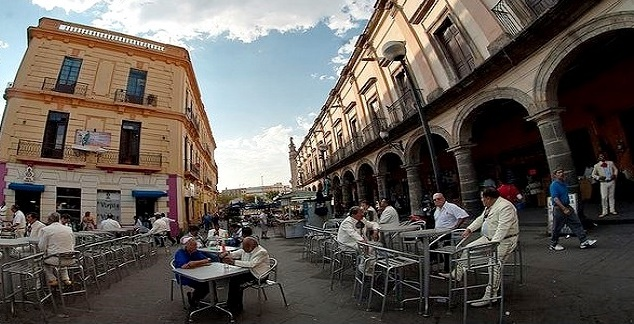
- The plaza in 2013
- Location: Guadalajara, Jalisco, Mexico
- Location within Mexico
- Coordinates: 20°40′30″N 103°20′29″W

Plaza de los Mariachis is a plaza in Guadalajara, in the Mexican state of Jalisco. The plaza often hosts mariachi bands.
