= Orders, decorations, and medals of Uruguay =

System of decorations of Uruguay

The system of orders, decorations and medals of Uruguay consists of both military and civilian honours presented by the authorities of Uruguay with the purpose of recognising and rewarding actions or services considered praiseworthy.

== Introduction ==
The Uruguayan Constitution provides in its article 85 section 13th that "ruling public honors due to great services" is a matter of competence of the General Assembly.

To members of the National Army, in matters of decoration usage, the basic rule is the Army's Regulation on Uniforms. Regarding decorations and badges granted by foreign governments or institutions, or by international organizations, to military officers or troops, the grantee must ask for permission from the Executive branch through the chain of command, unless the decorated individual received it through a national authority or with their knowledge, or on the occasion of an official mission approved by the Executive.

Once it was authorized, its use will become mandatory, and the military officers or troops will use it in their full dress uniform and any other uniforms, for ceremonies and parades. The bar of the decoration is used in the social and walk uniforms, but the decoration is not placed if it does not include a bar, unless the decorated individual is located in the country the decoration is from or in ceremonies organized by that country.

Regarding national decorations, they shall be used in the full dress uniform. The bar version is used in the case of social and walk uniforms. The usage of these decorations is mandatory and one is not required to ask for permission to use them, just to leave a notice through the chain of command.

== Civil awards ==
=== Medal of the Oriental Republic of Uruguay ===
Ribbon bar of the Medal of the Oriental Republic of Uruguay.

The Medal of the Oriental Republic of Uruguay is a decoration created in 1992, presented by the President of the Republic after the proposal of the Minister of Foreign Relations, to foreign personalities due to the principle of protocol reciprocity, a manner in the diplomatic community. Prior to proceeding with the presentation the General Assembly must be reported about the decoration to the grantee.

This decoration consists of the medal and a diploma, and it is granted in five ranks or categories, including Grand Cordon, Grand Officer, Officer and Commander.

=== Delmira Agustini Medal ===
The Delmira Agustini Medal is a medal created in 2013 to honor those citizens, natural or legal, and foreign personalities who contribute or had contributed to the culture and the arts that, in the opinion of the Ministry of Education and Culture of Uruguay, deserves such recognition. The medal was created on 4 January 2013 and was named after Uruguayan poet Delmira Agustini. The medal is presented by the Minister of Education and Culture in an informal ceremony, performed in public or privately.

=== Order of Sports Merit ===
The Order of Sports Merit is a decoration created in 1997 with the intention to honor those persons who due to their career path or relevant merits in sports, nationally or internationally, benefit Uruguay in the sports area. It could also honor persons that due to their intervention in covenants, acts, treaties and international organizations benefit Uruguay in the sports subject. This decoration is presented by the President of the Republic acting together with the Minister of Education and Culture (during some time, with the Minister of Sports and Youth when it existed) and, if it pertains due to the case, along with the Minister of Foreign Relations, from the proposal of the National Commission of Physical Education.

The President of the High Council for Sports of Spain (1993-1996) Rafael Cortés Elvira, chairman of the General Administration of Sport of China (1988-2000) Wu Shaozu, President of the High Council of Sports of Spain (1996-1998) Pedro Antonio Martín Marín, Secretary of Sports of Argentina (1996-1999) Hugo Porta, rally driver Gustavo Trelles, General Director of Sports of Chile Julio Riutort, and silver medalist in men's points race event of cycling at the 2000 Summer Olympics Milton Wynants, being this one awarded in 2000 the latest medal so far granted. After two decades without being granted it was presented to the Uruguay national under-20 football team after they became champions of the 2023 FIFA U-20 World Cup.

=== Suppressed civil awards ===
==== Order of the Oriental Republic of Uruguay ====
Ribbon of the Order of the Oriental Republic of Uruguay.

The Order of the Oriental Republic of Uruguay was a decoration created in 1984 by the authorities of the 1973-1985 civic-military dictatorship to award foreign personalities due to extraordinary praiseworthy acts performed in support of the country or due to reciprocity reasons. It was eliminated on 13 March 1985, a year after its creation by the recently elected democratic authorities, by the Law of validity of the acts of the dictatorship.

This Order was led by a President, who was the President of the Republic. It also was formed by an Honorary Council consisting of up to seven members: the President itself, the Chancellor (who was the Minister of Foreign Relations), a citizen representative of the Executive Branch, another of the Legislative Branch, and a third representative of the Supreme Court of Justice, a former ambassador of Uruguay, and if the honoree was a member of the Armed Forces of Uruguay, a military representative of the corresponding armed force.

The President of the Order or the Honorary Council had the initiative to propose a candidate to be honored. It could be awarded in the following ranks: Collar, Grand Cross, Sash (for women only), Commander, Officer and Knight.

==== Decoration Protector of the Free Peoples General José Artigas ====
The Decoration Protector of the Free Peoples General José Artigas was a decoration created in 1975 by the authorities of the 1973-1985 civic-military dictatorship to award those persons who contributed with extraordinary acts or services performed in favor of the country. It was also eliminated after the return to democracy by the recently elected authorities, by the Law of validity of the acts of the dictatorship.

The honored individuals were persons worthy of public recognition due to their exceptional talents or virtues, which led to extraordinary acts or services that favored Uruguay. It also was awarded to foreign heads of state worthy of it, according to the judgement of who at the time was holding the position of President of the Republic. Later it also was granted to national or foreign institutions or national symbols.

It was presented by the President of the Republic acting together with the pertinent Minister or Ministers, by their initiative, after the judgement of the Advisory Honorary Council. This judgement was not required if the honoree would be a foreign authority.

== Military awards ==
=== Medal of Military Merit ===
Ribbon of the Medal of Military Merit, third class.

The Medal of Military Merit is the highest military decoration related to the Army of Uruguay, that honor civilian and military personnel, national or foreign, as well as military units, due to their relevant services or outstanding contributions to the National Army, or in the case of military units, due to their exceptional performance in combat.

It is presented by the President of the Republic acting together with the Minister of National Defense, after the proposal of the Commander in Chief of the Army.

It consists of three ranks: General Officers and their civilian equivalents, High Officers and their civilian equivalents, and Chiefs and their civilian equivalents.

=== 18 May 1811 Medal ===
Ribbon of the 18 May 1811 Medal, third class.

The 18 May 1811 Medal is a military decoration of Uruguay, second in precedence after the Medal of Military Merit, presented by the Commander in Chief of the Army to civilians or military personnel, national or foreign, due to outstanding services to the National Army of Uruguay. It was created in 1997, and it was named to commemorate the Battle of Las Piedras which took place on that date.

It consists of three ranks: General Officers and their civilian equivalents, High Officers and their civilian equivalents, and Chiefs to lower Officials, troops and their civilian equivalents.

=== Medal of Military Valor ===
Ribbon of the Medla of Military Valor, first class.

The Medal of Military Valor is another military decoration related to the National Army, that was created in 2007, to award the military personnel who participated in outstanding acts or events during the fulfillment of duty that involve acts of valor or heroism worthy of being publicly recognized, that help to exalt the image and prestige of the National Army and to serve as an example to all the Army members. It is third in the order of precedence of Army-related awards.

It is presented by the Commander in Chief of the Army after the nomination of an Advisory Commission, and it consists of two ranks: Heroism and Distinguished Valor.

=== Medal of Aeronautical Merit ===
Ribbon of the Medal of Aeronautical Merit, first class.

The Medal of Aeronautical Merit is an Air Force-related military decoration of Uruguay, created by Decree No. 770/976 of 24 November 1976, to award civilians or military personnel, national or foreign, due to outstanding services related to the national aviation, or due to their valor and attributes related to aviation.

It is presented by the President of the Republic acting together with the Ministry of National Defense, after the nomination of the Commander in Chief of the Air Force. It consists of three ranks: Grand Officer, Officer and Knight.

Among the honored, could be mentioned Robert H. Foglesong and José Jiménez Ruiz.

=== Decoration Honor of Naval Merit Commander Peter Campbell ===
Ribbon of the Decoration Honor of Naval Merit Commander Peter Campbell, second class.

The Decoration Honor of Naval Merit Commander Peter Campbell is a military decoration from the branch of decorations of the National Navy of Uruguay that was created in 1993, to award military personnel and civilians, national or foreign, but also to military units, and to public or private institutions, national or foreign, due to outstanding services or relevant personal acts performed in favor of the National Navy, worthy of recognition.

It consists of two ranks: Grand Medal and Medal.

=== 15 November 1817 Medal ===
The 15 November 1817 Medal is a Navy-related military decoration created in 2000, that is presented by the Commander in Chief of the Navy to military personnel and civilians, national or foreign, public or private institutions, national or foreign, due to their merits related to the Navy or in cooperation with the Navy, that are worthy of recognition in the opinion of the General Command of the Navy.

=== Decoration General José Artigas, Leader of the Orientals ===
The Decoration General José Artigas, Leader of the Orientals is a decoration created in 2013 to be awarded by the Defense Staff, part of the Ministry of National Defense, to military personnel and civilians, national or foreign, due to having provided or is currently providing outstanding services to the country in military matters to the Ministry of National Defense, to the Defense Staff or to the Armed Forces altogether.

It consists of two ranks: Grand Medal, granted to military officers, national or foreign authorities, and to military units or public or private institutions, national or foreign; and Medal, to military officers and troops, national or foreign authorities, civilians with prominent in the scientific, cultural, artistic or trade fields, and to military units and public or private institutions, national o foreign.

It was currently awarded once to the Chief of the Joint Defense Staff of the Armed Forces of Argentina and then seems to be fallen into disuse.

=== Historical campaigns decorations ===
==== Medal for the Battle of Tacuarembó ====
The Medal for the Battle of Tacuarembó was a decoration granted by the National Army, created by Decree of 26 July 1836, that was awarded by the government of President Manuel Oribe after the victory over the rebel forces led by the ex-president Fructuoso Rivera.

==== Shield of San Antonio ====
The Shield of San Antonio was a military decoration granted by the Defense Government in 1846 to the members of the Italian Legion led by Giuseppe Garibaldi after their resistance with a numerical disadvantage, that ended with victory against the forces allied with Manuel Oribe under the command of General Servando Gómez.

The homage and presentation of the honor was performed in March in Montevideo, where the troops of the garrison stood along 18 de Julio Avenue, and the troops of the Italian Legion located in the Constitution Square to receive the decoration, a flag and a copy of the decree. After the ceremony, the Army marched in front of the honored.

==== Monte Caseros Medal ====
Depiction of the Monte Caseros Medal, first class.

The Monte Caseros Medal was a military decoration granted by the government of Uruguay in 1852 to the members of the Uruguayan Division who took part in the Battle of Caseros and subsequently also awarded to any other Uruguayan citizens that fought in that battle, as a commemoration of the Uruguayan joint victory with the forces of the Brazilian Empire and those of the General Justo José de Urquiza against the forces of Juan Manuel Rosas.

==== Yatay Medal ====
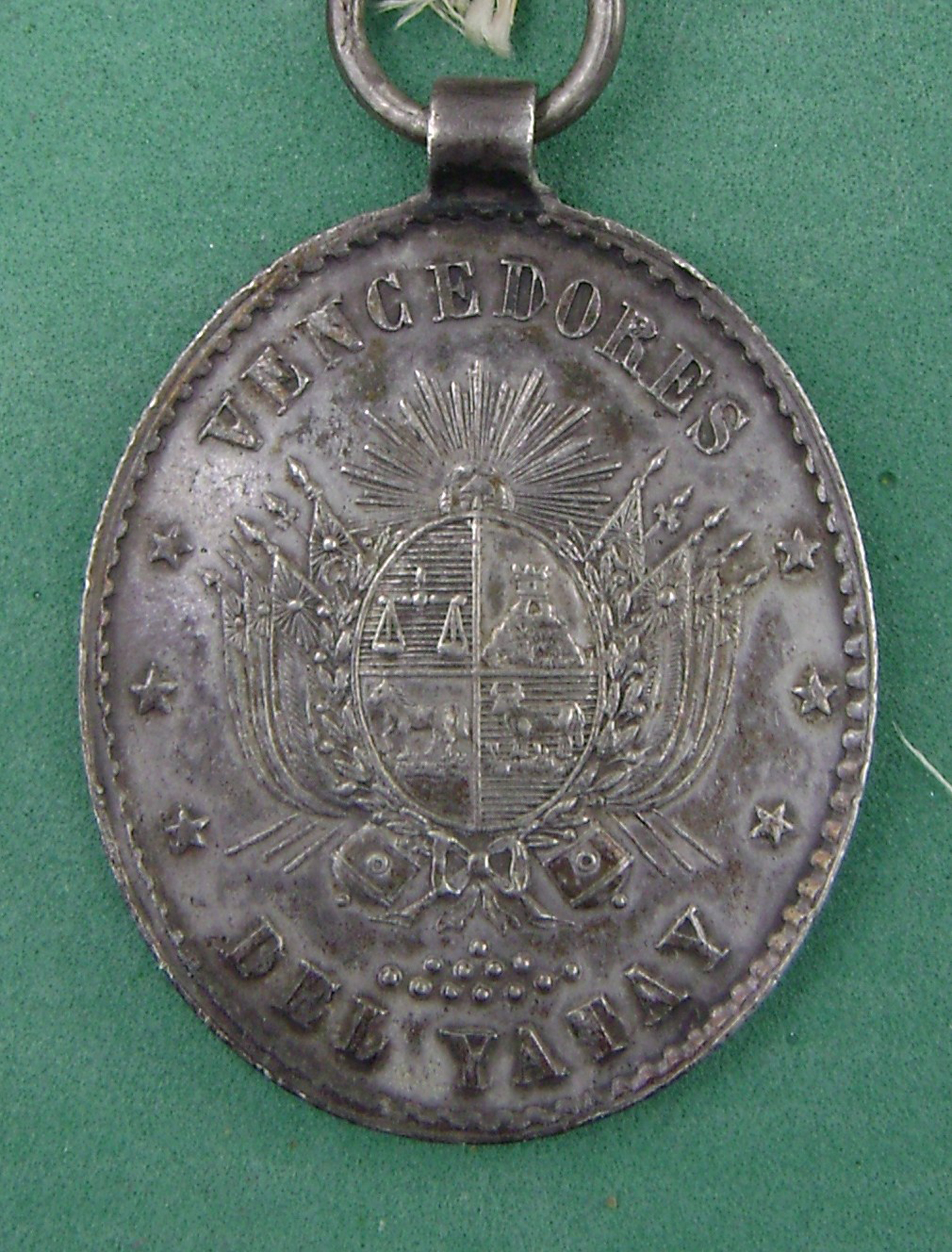
Image of the Yatay Medal, second class.

The Yatay Medal was a military decoration granted in 1865 by the Uruguayan government to honor the Uruguayan allied forces led by Venancio Flores who participated in the Battle of Yatay, part of the Paraguayan War, against the forces led by Paraguayan Pedro Duarte.

==== Commemorative Medal for the Campaign in Paraguay ====
The Commemorative Medal for the Campaign in Paraguay was an international military decoration created by a protocol signed between the governments of Argentina and Brazil on 17 May 1888, that Uruguayan government belatedly joined in 1890 by Law No. 2127 of 20 December of that year. It decorated, not just commemorate as the name suggests, to the members of the Army and Navy that were veterans of the Paraguayan War.

=== Suppressed military awards ===
==== Order of Military Merit of the Companions of Artigas ====
The Order of Military Merit of the Companions of Artigas was an order and military decoration related to the National Army of Uruguay, created under the government of the 1973-1985 civic-military dictatorship, to award civilians and military personnel, national or foreign, due to outstanding services or relevant personal works worthy of recognition by the Army. In the beginning it was shared between the National Army and the Air Force, but later the Air Force got its own decoration. It was the first time in Uruguayan history that an order was created. It was eliminated after the return to democracy on 13 March 1985 by the Law of validity of the acts of the dictatorship.

It consisted of five ranks: Grand Cross, Grand Officer, Commander, Officer and Knight.

==== Order of Naval Merit Commander Peter Campbell ====
The Order of Naval Merit Commander Peter Campbell was a military decoration of the Navy of Uruguay created in 1980 to award military and civilian individuals, national or foreign, who have provided or were providing relevant services to the National Navy. It could also be awarded to military units, or to public or private institutions, national or foreign, due to relevant acts worthy of recognition by the National Army. It was eliminated after the return to democracy on 13 March 1985 by the Law of validity of the acts of the dictatorship.

It consisted of two ranks or categories: Grand Medal and Medal. It was presented by the President of the Republic, after the initiative of the Commander in Chief of the Navy.

== Order of precedence ==
For current military awards, there is an order of precedence for the placement and presentation on the military uniform for the members of the military branch to which the decoration is part of:

#	National Army	Uruguayan Air Force	National Navy
1°	Medal of Military Merit	Medal of Aeronautical Merit	Decoration Honor of Naval Merit
2°	18 May 1811 Medal	—N/a	17 November 1817 Medal
3°	Medal of Military Valor	—N/a	—N/a
