= Statue of Irene Robledo =

Statue in Guadalajara, Jalisco, Mexico

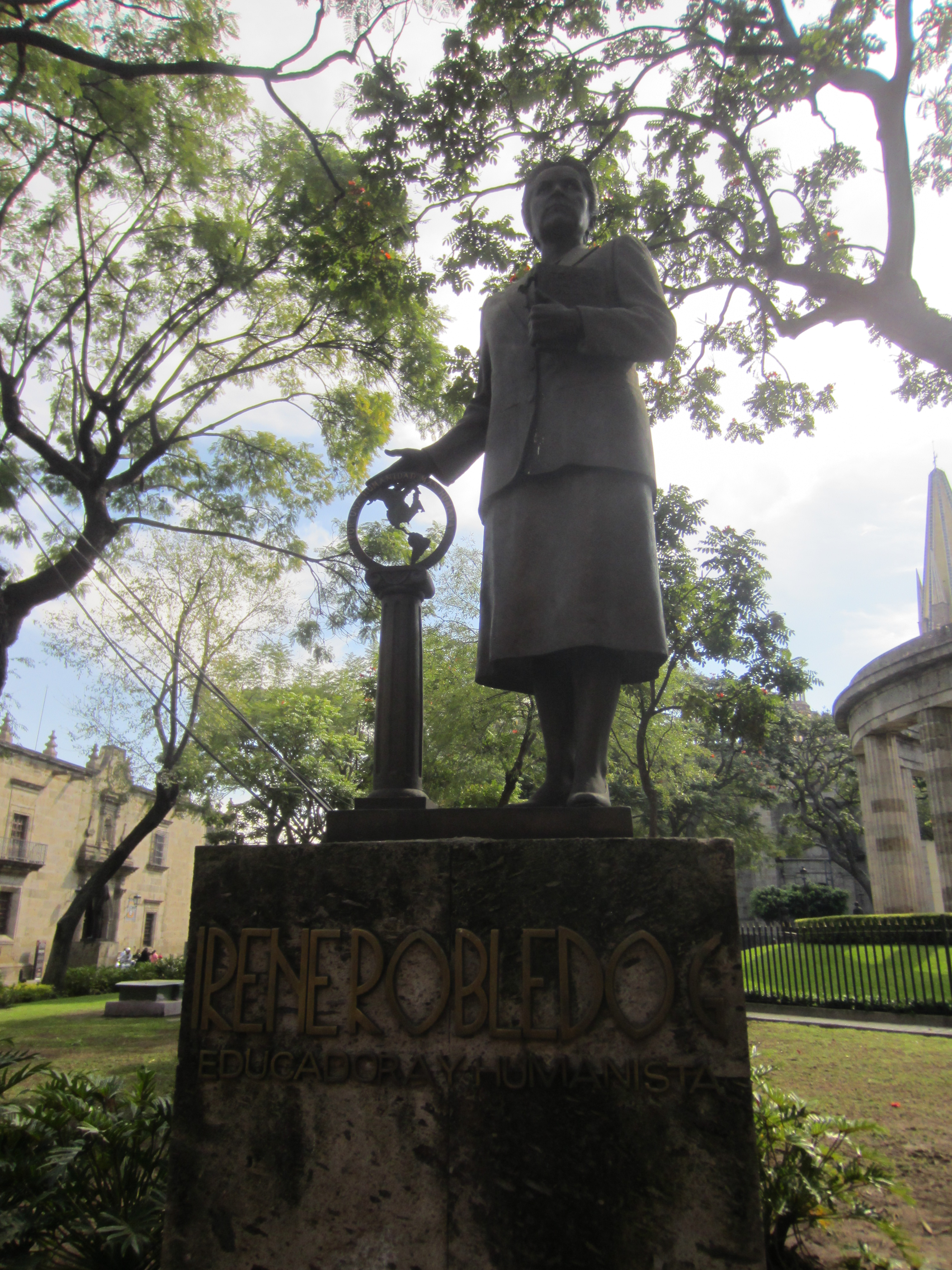
- The statue in 2021
- Year: 2000
- Subject: Irene Robledo
- Location: Guadalajara, Jalisco, Mexico; 20°40′41″N 103°20′48.6″W

A statue of Irene Robledo is installed along the Rotonda de los Jaliscienses Ilustres in Centro, Guadalajara, in the Mexican state of Jalisco. Before its installation (and that of Rita Pérez Jiménez) the roundabout was named the "Rotonda de los Hombres Ilustres". Robledo's rests remain there. The statue was installed in 2000.
