= Rita Pérez de Moreno =

Mexican insurgent and war heroine

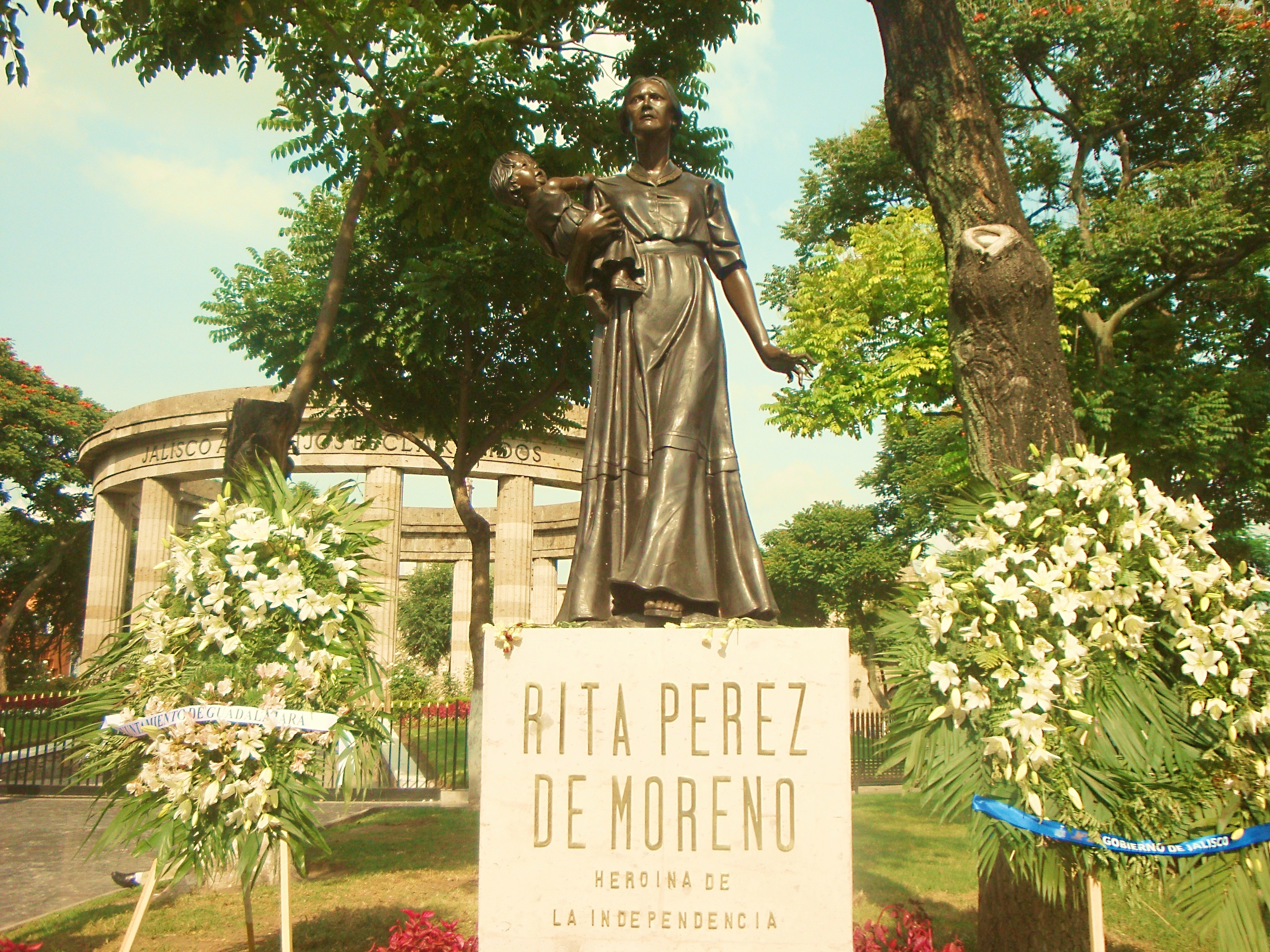
- Statue of Pérez de Moreno in the Rotonda de los Jaliscienses Ilustres in Guadalajara, Jalisco
- Born: María Rita de la Trinidad Pérez Jiménez; 23 May 1779; Cañada del Cura, San Juan de los Lagos, Viceroyalty of New Spain
- Died: 27 August 1861 (aged 82); San Juan de los Lagos, Jalisco, Mexico
- Resting place: Rotonda de los Jaliscienses Ilustres
- Spouse: Pedro Moreno (m. 1799–1817)
- Children: José Luis Esteban; Josefa de los Dolores; María Josefa Marcelina; José María de Jesús; María Luisa; María Guadalupe Lucía; Prudencia; Severiano

María Rita de la Trinidad Pérez Jiménez (23 May 1779 – 27 August 1861), commonly known as Doña Rita Pérez de Moreno, was an insurgent of the Mexican War of Independence, along with her husband Pedro Moreno.

== Early life ==
Pérez de Moreno was born on the hacienda of Cañada del Cura, in the jurisdiction of San Juan de los Lagos, Viceroyalty of New Spain (present-day Mexico), to Don José María Pérez and his second wife, Doña Rafaela Jiménez. Of Spanish descent, her family was well-off and respected among the local community.

== Biography ==
=== Early life ===
Rita Pérez was the daughter of the marriage formed by José María Máximo Pérez-Franco and Sáenz de Vidaurri and Rafaela Margarita Jiménez de Mendoza y de Covarrubias, a family of landowners from Los Altos de Jalisco. She married the landowner and anti-Spanish activist Pedro Moreno, a landowner from Santa María de los Lagos (present-day Lagos de Moreno), on 1 May 1799 in San Juan de los Lagos, with whom she had several children:

- José Luis Esteban Moreno Pérez (1802-1817)
- Josefa de los Dolores Moreno Pérez (1805-1806)
- María Josefa Marcelina Moreno Pérez (1807-1881)
- José María de Jesús Moreno Pérez (1810-1810)
- María Luisa Moreno Pérez (1811-1873)
- María Guadalupe Lucía Moreno Pérez (1812-1833)
- Severiano Moreno Pérez (1815-1818)
- Prudencia Moreno Pérez (1816-1817)

She joined the independence struggle together with her husband. At the Fort of the Hat, Rita was in charge of cooking and distributing food, as well as curing all those rebels who were injured in the fighting until she was taken prisoner, becoming the administrator and a strong arm of the armed struggle.

Together with his children, he suffered the horrors of war. In 1813, his daughter María Guadalupe was taken prisoner by a royalist chief for the service of the Spanish monarchy. He suffered the pain of seeing his fifteen-year-old son, Luis Moreno, die on 10 March 1817 while fighting the royalist troops in combat. Rita Pérez de Moreno, while pregnant, and her small children – Josefa, Luisa, Severiano and Prudencia – were taken prisoner by the royalists on 19 August 1817 during the royalists' attack on the Hat Fort, and Javier Mina and Pedro managed to flee. Moreno, among others. From there, she was taken to the León prison (Guanajuato) and later to Silao. In this town, his daughter Prudencia dies at one year one month old from hunger, and later, Severiano, at two and a half years old, from mistreatment and the desolation of prisons. She received the fatal news of the death of her husband, Don Pedro Moreno, who was murdered on 27 October 1817, during the royalists' attack on the El Venadito ranch. It was released in 1819 by Viceroy Juan Ruiz de Apodaca. He returned to Lagos de Moreno amid hardships due to harassment and the dispossession of his properties by the royalists, where he died.

=== Later years and death ===
Due to her participation in the insurgency, Pérez de Moreno was made a prisoner for several years until Viceroy Juan Ruiz de Apodaca granted her freedom. She lived the rest of her life in the house she inherited from her parents in San Juan de los Lagos. She died of edema (hidropesía in Spanish) on 27 August 1861, at the age of 82, and was buried the following day in the cemetery of San Juan de los Lagos.

== Awards ==
Multiple times her name and memory have been honored for being an outstanding heroine of the movement, for which she was named with the name of Mexican independence. Her name is inscribed in gold letters in the Assembly Hall of the Legislative Power of the State of Jalisco by decree number 8,473 of January 4, 1969. In 2010 it was announced that the remains of Rita Pérez Jiménez would be transferred to the Rotunda of the Jalisco Illustrious. The act had been considered in 1955 by Agustín Yáñez, governor of Jalisco, but after an investigation it was determined that the remains of the heroine had become part of the common ossuary of the San Juan de los Lagos cemetery in 1927, so it could not be done. Finally, during the seventh session of the Culture Commission of the Jalisco State Congress, Deputy Rocío Corona Nakamura commented that the State Institute of Forensic Sciences confirmed that the remains exhumed from the tomb of Rita Pérez de Moreno are legitimate. On 27 August 2010, the remains of the heroine arrived at the Rotunda of Illustrious Jaliscienses after a ceremony with a funeral procession that began at the Government Palace together with the unveiling of her statue created by the sculptor Rubén Orozco Loza.

In the House of Culture of the city of Lagos de Moreno, on 5 May 2010, the presentation of the book "Doña Rita, heroine and worthy of Jalisco" was held, written by Rogelio López Espinoza with a circulation of 2 1,500 copies that were distributed in different parts of the state of Jalisco.

== See also ==
- Josefa Ortiz de Domínguez
- María Ignacia Rodríguez de Velasco y Osorio Barba

== Bibliography ==
- Rivera de la Torre, Antonio (1917). "Penalidades de doña Rita Pérez de Moreno" (PDF). Francisco Javier Mina y Pedro Moreno: caudillos libertadores. Editorial de la Dirección General de Educación Pública. pp. 165–174.
