= Order of the Republic =

Order of the Republic may refer to:

- Order of the Republika Srpska, in Bosnia and Herzegovina
- Order of the Republic (Egypt)
- Order of the Republic (Gambia)
- Order of Islamic Republic, in Iran
- Order of the Republic (Moldova)
- Order of the Republic of Montenegro
- Order of the Federal Republic, in Nigeria
- Order of the Republic of Serbia
- Order of the Republic (Sierra Leone)
- Order of the Spanish Republic
- Order of the Republic (Sudan)
- Order of the Republic of Trinidad and Tobago
- Order of the Republic (Tunisia)
- Order of the Republic (Turkey)
- Order of the Oriental Republic of Uruguay
- Order of the Republic (Yugoslavia), see Orders, decorations, and medals of the Socialist Federal Republic of Yugoslavia

== See also ==
- Medal of the Republic (disambiguation)
- Order of Barbados
