= Peter Campbell (naval officer) =

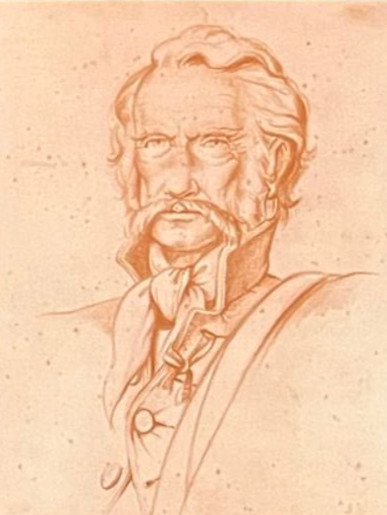
- Born: 1780; County Tipperary, Ireland
- Died: 1832 (aged 51–52); Pilar, Paraguay
- Military career
- Allegiance: United Provinces of the River Plate
- Conflicts: British invasions of the River Plate; War of Independence; Argentine Civil Wars

Peter Campbell, also known in Spanish as Pedro Campbell (1780, County Tipperary, Ireland – c. 1832 South America), was an Irish naval officer who founded the Uruguayan Navy.

== Biography ==
Campbell was born in County Tipperary, Ireland, in 1780. Little is known about Campbell's early years in Ireland, except that he was probably apprenticed as a tanner. He enlisted in the 71st (Highland) Regiment of Foot, one of the divisions that in July 1805 sailed for the Cape of Good Hope. In 1806 these troops invaded Buenos Aires under William Carr Beresford during the Anglo-Spanish War.

After the British campaigns failed in their attempt and the regiment withdrew, Campbell was one of the soldiers who managed to remain in the River Plate. He joined the patriot ranks as a guerrilla leader, harassing Spanish forces both on land and on the Paraná River. He was remarkable for his dexterity in gaucho-style duel, wielding a long knife in one hand and using a poncho wrapped around the other arm as a protective measure. He carried two riding pistols, a sabre, and a large knife in a leather sheath for his personal protection, and was assisted by a County Tipperary-born gaucho known as 'Don Eduardo'.

Campbell rose to prominence as a superb guerrilla fighter, serving under José Artigas, the caudillo of a region which encompassed the present-day Argentine provinces of Entre Ríos and Corrientes, and much of Uruguay, a man regarded as one of Uruguay's founding fathers. Peter Campbell played a prominent role in the affairs of Corrientes province, and for a period after 1819 acted as its deputy governor.

First against the Spaniards during the Argentine War of Independence and later against Buenos Aires in the civil wars that followed Argentine sovereignty. Campbell was responsible for establishing a regiment of mounted Tapé indigenous people. They were feared both as a cavalry and infantry force because their tactics were so difficult to counteract. Armed with rifles with long bayonets attached to them, his indigenous force was trained to charge the enemy on horseback at great speed before dismounting and opening fire with their rifles.

In 1814, Campbell began putting together a squadron of river vessels to support Artigas on the Paraná. In 1818 Peter Campbell took charge of the second squadron of the Uruguayan naval forces, based in Goya and Esquina, Corrientes. He became naval commander-in-chief of the region and the scourge of the Paraguayan dictator Francia's river fleet. On 21 August 1818 Artigas appointed Campbell as the first naval commander of the patriot fleet. It is on the basis of this appointment that the Irishman is acknowledged as the founder of the Uruguayan navy. In September 1818 Peter Campbell managed to seize two vessels carrying arms for the Paraguayan army. Between January and March 1819, together with the land forces of governor López, Campbell besieged the town of Capilla del Rosario. On 10 March 1819 the Uruguayan army won the Battle of Barrancas against the army of Buenos Aires. Advancing on the Argentine city, the combined federalist forces defeated the porteños at Cepeda (1 February 1820) and San Nicolás (13 February 1820).

However, in the final naval battle against Monteverde on 30 July 1820, Artigas was defeated by Ramírez, a rival warlord from Entre Ríos province. Campbell, who initially succeeded in escaping, was captured and banished in shackles to Paraguay. The dictator Francia, instead of putting his former foe to death, spared Campbell's life, possibly out of respect for his adversary's courage and military prowess. Peter Campbell was allowed to settle in the Paraguayan Ñeembucú Department, where he returned to his former trade of tanner.

There is disagreement over the location and date of Campbell's death, which occurred around 1832. After his burial place in Villa del Pilar was discovered in 1961, his remains were handed over to Uruguay for reinterment in Montevideo on 18 May 1961.

The Navy of Uruguay has several medals named after him. In addition, after being acquired by Uruguay, the USS Chickadee was renamed as the ROU Comandante Pedro Campbell (MSF-1) in Campbell's honour.

== Bibliography ==
- Pyne, Peter, The Invasions of Buenos Aires, 1806-1807: the Irish Dimension (Liverpool: University of Liverpool, Institute of Latin American Studies, 1996). Research Paper 20.
- The Southern Cross. Número del Centenario (Buenos Aires, 1975).
- Jim Byrne, Philip Coleman and Jason King (eds.), Ireland and the Americas: Culture, Politics and History (Santa Barbara, CA: ABC-CLIO, forthcoming 2006).
