= Decoration Honor of Naval Merit Commander Peter Campbell =

Highest militar decoration of the Navy of Uruguay

- Type: Military decoration
- Awarded for: Performing relevant personal services or works to the Uruguayan Navy.
- Country: Uruguay
- Presented by: the President of Uruguay
- Eligibility: Civilians, military officers, military units, institutions, Uruguayan or foreign.
- Status: Currently awarded
- Established: 17 August 1993
- First award: 26 October 1993
- Final award: 22 July 2019
- Ribbon of the decoration

Precedence
- Next (lower): 15 November 1817 Medal

The Decoration Honor of Naval Merit Commander Peter Campbell (Spanish: Condecoración Honor al Mérito Naval Comandante Pedro Campbell) (Note: Some sources, mainly legal ones, refer to this award as Medal (despite the denomination of its ranks), Order (in this case confusing it with the name of the precedent decoration with similar purposes created during the 1973-1985 dictatorship and suppressed after the return to democracy) or Distinction (according to the unifying rules of terminology of decorations and military medals).) is an Uruguayan military decoration awarded by the President of Uruguay to civilians, military officers, military units or to institutions, Uruguayan or foreign, as a recognition of the relevant services or works performed to the Uruguayan Navy. This decoration was named after Peter Campbell, an Irish naval officer who became the first commander of the Naval forces created by José Artigas.

== Eligibility and appointment ==
This decoration is awarded to military officers and civilians, Uruguayan or foreign, as a recognition to the fulfillment of relevant services or personal works provided to the Uruguayan Navy. Can also be awarded with the decoration military units and public or private institutions, national or foreign, whose relevance make them worthy of this recognition.

The award is presented by the President of the Republic at the proposal of the Commander-in-Chief of the Navy.

Since 2018, whoever is designated by the Executive branch as Commander-in-Chief of the Navy will be automatically receive this decoration in the rank of Great Medal, in recognition o their relevant performance in the practice of the military profession.

== Ranks ==
This decoration has two ranks:

1. Grand Medal. Granted to officers of the Armed Forces in the case of military personnel; for national and foreign authorities in the case of civilians; for military units, public or private institutions, national or foreign.
2. Medal. For officers and enlisted personnel of the Armed Forces in the case of military personnel; for national and foreign authorities and persons in the scientific, cultural, artistic and commercial fields in the case of civilians; for military units, public or private institutions, national or foreign.

== Appearance ==
This award consists of medal, ribbon, bar, button and miniature.

=== Medal ===
On its obvers it has an eight-ray sun in gold or golden metal for Grand Medal rank or in silver or silver metal for Medal rank, framed by two branches joined at their base with a ribbon, and in the center lies the coat of arms of the Navy with a diameter of 35 millimeters.

On the backside, with a plain background, it bears the inscription "HONOR AL MÉRITO NAVAL COMANDANTE PEDRO CAMPBELL" ("HONOR OF NAVAL MERIT COMMANDER PETER CAMPBELL") written as a circle, and in the lower side is the text "REPÚBLICA ORIENTAL DEL URUGUAY" ("EASTERN REPUBLIC OF URUGUAY") and in the upper side the name of the honoree is engraved.

=== Ribbon ===
The ribbon is 35 millimeters wide and 45 of height, flanked by a 2-millimeter red stripe on each side, followed inside by a 2-millimeter white stripe each side and a marine blue stripe in its center.

=== Bar ===
The bar is made of metal of 35 millimeters of width and 10 millimeters of height, covered by the same pattern of the medal's ribbon, on which is the coat of arms of the Navy in gold or golden metal for Grand Medal and in silver or silver metal for Medal rank.

=== Button ===
The button depicts the coat of arms of the Navy with 10 millimeters in diameter on a 15-millimeter by 3-millimeter bar in gold or golden metal for Grand Medal and in silver or silver metal for Medal class.

=== Miniature ===
It is a version of reduced size of the medal with the same features, but with a diameter of 17 millimeters and a ribbion of 17 millimeters. For Grand Medal is minted in gold or golden metal while for Medal category is minted in silver or silver metal.

== See also ==
- Orders, decorations, and medals of Uruguay
- Peter Campbell (naval officer)
