= Statue of Pedro Moreno =

Statue in Guadalajara, Jalisco, Mexico

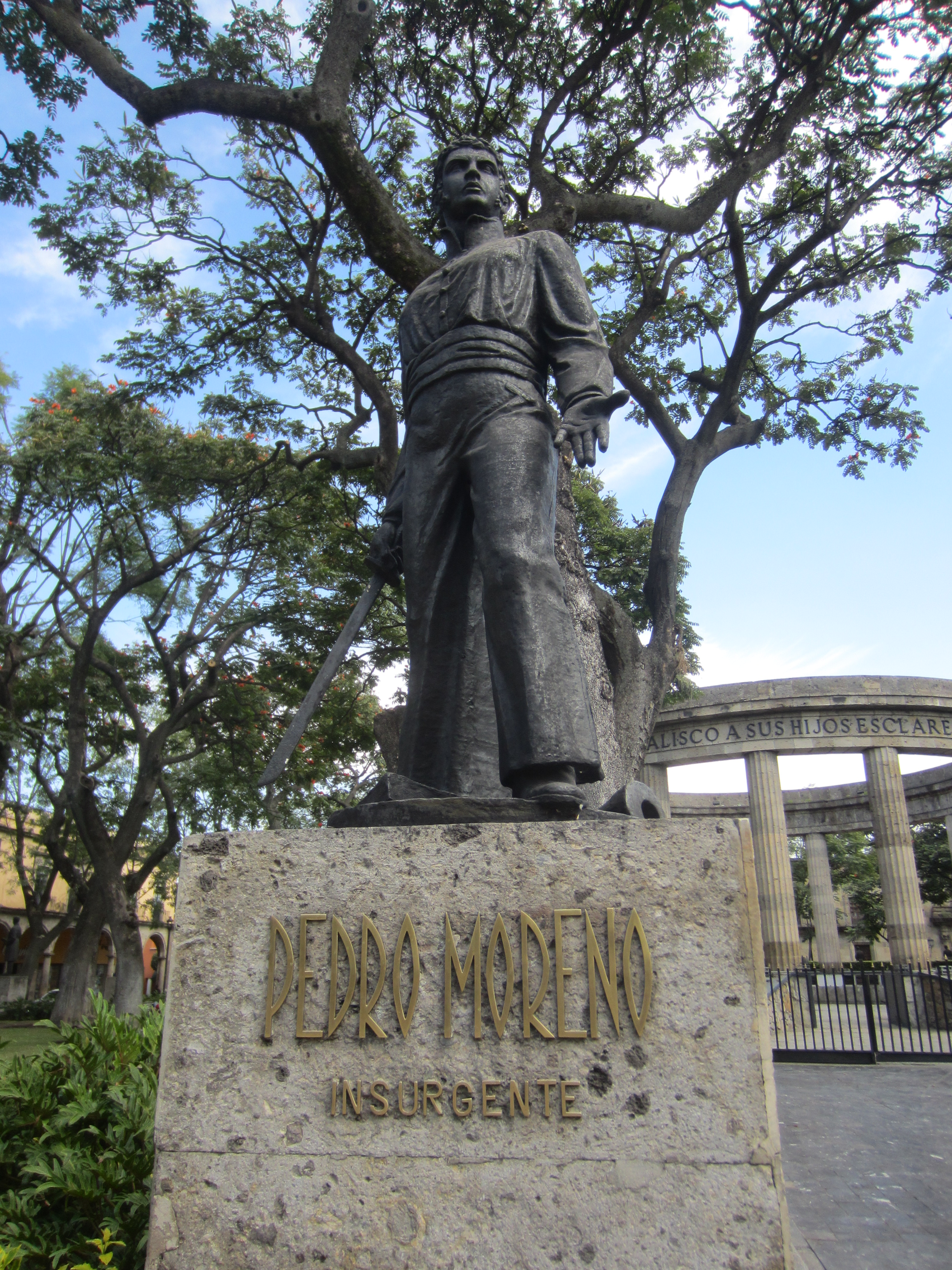
- The statue in 2021
- Subject: Pedro Moreno
- Location: Guadalajara, Jalisco, Mexico; 20°40′40.1″N 103°20′50.4″W

The statue of Pedro Moreno is installed along the Rotonda de los Jaliscienses Ilustres, in Centro, Guadalajara, in the Mexican state of Jalisco.

A statue of his wife Rita Pérez de Moreno is also installed at the site.
