= Medal of Military Valor (Uruguay) =

- Type: Military decoration
- Awarded for: Participate in outstanding events or actions during fulfillment of duty involving acts of courage of heroism.
- Country: Uruguay
- Presented by: the Commander-in-Chief of the Uruguayan Army
- Eligibility: Uruguayan military officers
- Status: Currently awarded
- Established: 25 June 2007
- Ribbon of the first class medal

Order of Wear
- Next (higher): 18 May 1811 Medal

The Medal of Military Valor is an Uruguayan military decoration awarded by the Commander-in-Chief of the Army to military personnel of that armed force who participated in outstanding acts or events during the fulfillment of duty that involve acts of valor or heroism worthy of being publicly recognized, that help to exalt the image and prestige of the National Army.

== Eligibility and appointment ==
This medal is awarded to military personnel of the Uruguayan Army who participated in outstanding events or acts during their services that denote acts of courage or heroism, which by their nature elevate the image and prestige of this armed branch and also to serve as an exemplary guide for the rest of the Army personnel to follow. This award may be granted post mortem.

This award is presented by the Commander-in-Chief of the Army at the proposal of the Advisory Commission, made up of three active military officers of general officers level.

The presentation is made in a formal ceremony at the location of the military unit where the honoree is currently serving, directed by the Commander-in-Chief of the Army or a representative.

== Ranks ==
This medal has two ranks which, unlike the other Uruguayan military decorations, does not depend on the hierarchy within the military branch of the honoree, but on the traits of their actions, each one of these being able to be awarded both to officers and enlisted personnel. These are:

1. Heroism. Heroism implies the effort and voluntary determination of the person to take part in extraordinary acts or events in service to the Homeland.
2. Distinguished Valor. Valor is that attribute of mind that motivates the person to perform difficult tasks, facing dangers without fear.

== Appearance ==
This award consist of medal, ribbon, bar, miniature and diploma. The colors on the medal, ribbon, bar and miniature refer to the colors of Artigas and the ideals of the National Army. As of metals, gold and silver, one refers to the virtues of justice and clemency, symbolizing purity, generosity, vitality, power and resolve against danger, while the other represents the virtues of humility, innocence, purity and integrity. The cross of the medal represents sacrifice and abnegation. The Sun, present in pre-Columbian American symbology such as in Inca culture, represents the giver of life and fortune.

=== Medal ===
The medal is a Greek cross made of gold-plated metal of 4 centimeters of width and height, filled in gules for "Heroism" rank and in silver for "Distinguished Valor", loaded in its center with an azure circle of 1.5 centimeters in diameter, on which an eight-ray sun is charged, at the base of which is a laurel and olive tree branches, tied by a ribbon, all in gold. On the backside, the medal has a 1.5-centimeter circle engraved with the text "Medalla al Valor Militar, Ejército Nacional, Uruguay" ("Medal of Military Valor, National Army, Uruguay").

=== Ribbon ===
The ribbon is in fabric of 3.6 centimeters wide in three columns, the central in white, the left in blue and the right in red. It has a length of 8 centimeters, in the upper side of which a metallic pin-like clasp hangs to pin on the chest, and in the lower side there is a golden ring from which the medal hangs.

=== Bar ===
It is made of metal of 3.6 centimeters long by 1 centimeter wide, covered with the same patter of the ribbon. In the white part of its center an eight-ray sun is charged relief with the wreath of laurel and olive branches tied with a ribbon, in gold for "Heroism" and in silver for "Distinguished Valor".

=== Miniature ===
The miniature is a version of reduced size of the medal, 2.5 centimeters of width and height, which hangs from a ribbon of 5 centimeters of height and 2 centimeters of width, with the same pattern of the large-sized ribbon.

=== Diploma ===
The diploma contains a copy of the administrative resolution of the Commander-in-Chief of the Army.

== See also ==
- Medal of Military Merit
