= Medal of the Republic (disambiguation) =

Medal of the Republic is the highest honorary medal of the People's Republic of China.

Medal of the Republic may also refer to:

- Medal of the Oriental Republic of Uruguay, the highest civilian honour of Uruguay.
- Medal of the Republic (TV series), a 2021 Chinese television series

== See also ==
- Order of the Republic (disambiguation)
