= Sebastián Ruiz de Apodaca =

Spanish naval commander (1747–1818)

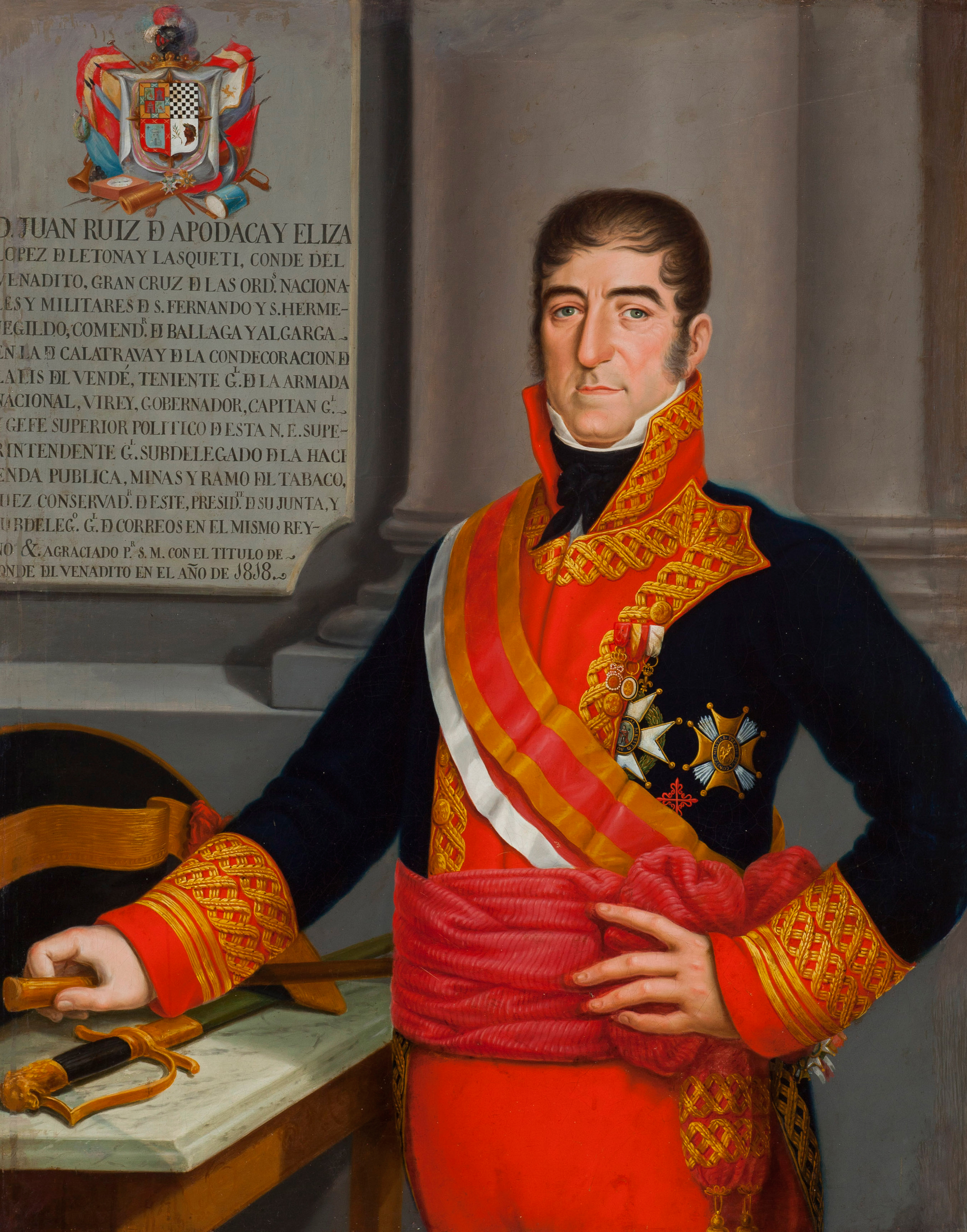
Sebastián Ruiz de Apodaca's younger brother Juan Ruiz de Apodaca

Sebastián José Ruiz de Apodaca y Eliza (August 21, 1747 – April 6, 1818) was a Spanish naval officer, predominantly known for participating in the Invasion of Trinidad.

== Early life ==
Sebastián Ruiz de Apodaca was born into a Spanish family of Basque origin merchants in Cadiz in 1747. His father was Tomás Ruiz de Apodaca and his mother was Eusebia de Eliza. He was brother to Juan Ruiz de Apodaca, 1st Count of Venadito (1754–1835). He had another brother called Vicente who also went into the navy like his two brothers, as well as being Mayor of Mariña.

== Naval career ==
He began his naval career as a midshipman in the Mariñas Guard Corps of Cadiz on the 2 January 1760, rising to frigate ensign in 1767. He carried out naval campaigns in the Mediterranean and the Americas. In 1769 he became a ship's ensign. He then became a Frigate Lieutenant on the 11 January 1773, in just over a year he then rose to the rank of Ship Lieutenant. He served in the fleet of the Marquis of Casa-Tilly, serving in South America against the Portuguese. He became a frigate Captain in late 1777 before becoming Ship Captain in 1780, commanding the ship Firme. He campaigned with the fleet of Lieutenant General Louis de Córdova and the Count of Estaing in the English Channel and Atlantic, capturing an English convoy of 24 ships. He then commanded a squadron of ships, these ships were the Trinidad, Triunfante, San Carlos and the Conde de la Regla, this squadron was added to the fleet of Francisco de Borja. The fleet served in the Mediterranean fighting the French Republic, and protecting the Italian States. He became a General Brigadier and squadron leader by 1794.

The burning ships during the capture of Trinidad

He became a subordinate General to José de Mazzarredo in 1795, afterwards he headed to the Americas with the Marquis of Socorro, he commanded four ships and three frigate to defend Trinidad, he was stationed at the Port of Chaguaramas. The British attacked the island on the 16 February 1797, the Spanish were blocked in the port, the battle was doomed and Apodaca set fire to his ships the following day, on the 18 February 1797 the Spanish governor and troops capitulated. The POWs were sent by the British to Cadiz. In Spain, Apodaca along with other generals were tried for their failure in the defence and the loss of the ships, Apodaca stayed in prison from 1797 until 1801 when he was freed by Lieutenant General Antonio de Escaño on the behalf of Prince Ferdinand VII. He later became a Lieutenant General in 1814.

== Personal life ==
He joined the Order of Calatrava in 1783 along with his brothers. He died naturally on the island of San Fernando in 1818.
