= Juan Ruiz de Apodaca, 1st Count of Venadito =

Spanish Navy officer and colonial administrator

The Most Excellenti Captain General Juan Ruiz de Apodaca The Count of Venadito OIC OSH KOC
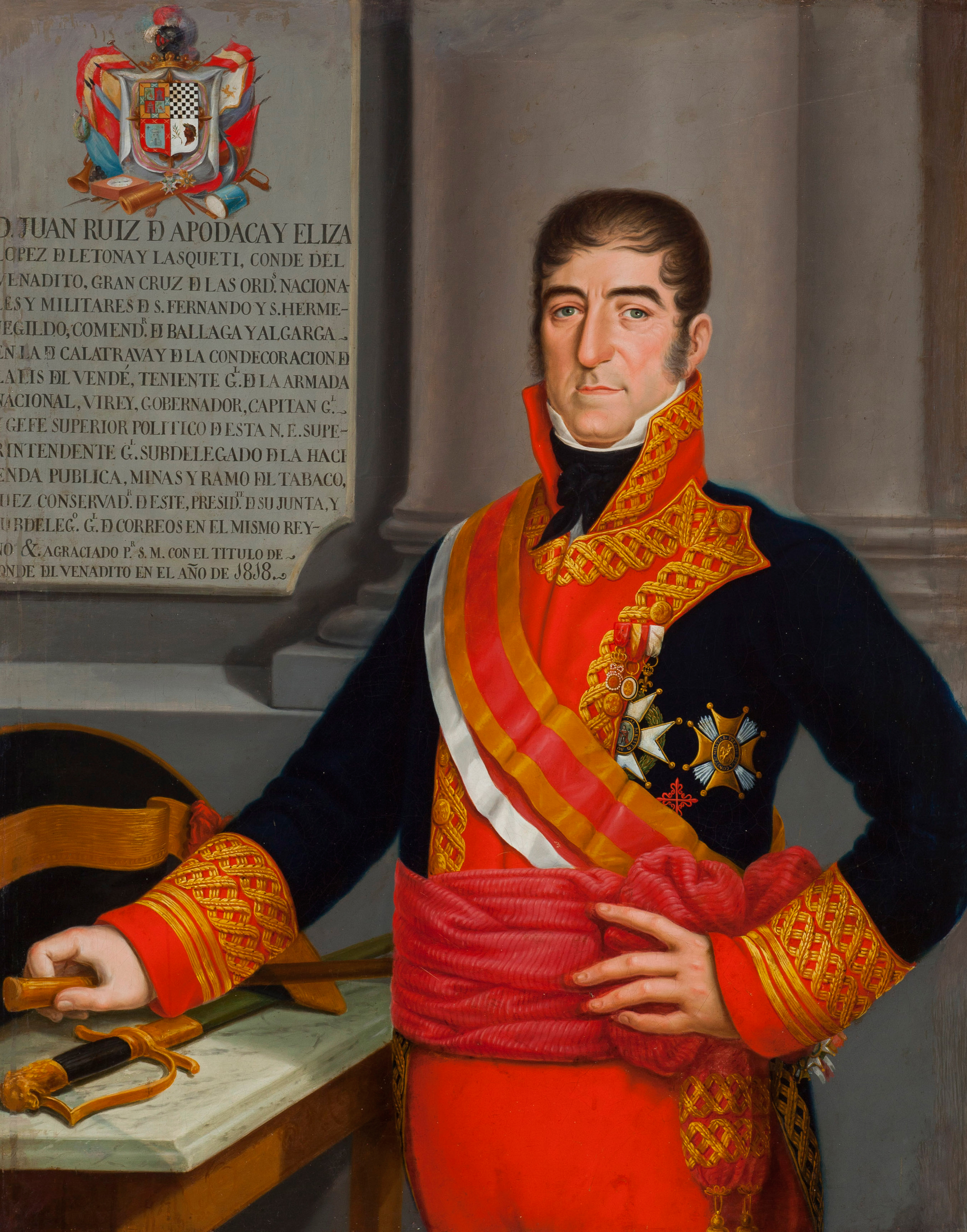
- Ruiz de Apodaca as viceroy of New Spain

61st Viceroy of New Spain
- In office 20 September 1816 – 5 July 1821
- Monarch: Ferdinand VII
- First Secretary of State: José García de León y Pizarro; Carlos Martínez de Irujo; Manuel González Salmón; Joaquín José de Melgarejo; Juan Jabat Aztal (as interim); Evaristo Pérez de Castro
- Secretary of State for the Indies: Antonio González Salmón; Antonio Porcel Román
- Preceded by: Félix María Calleja del Rey
- Succeeded by: Juan O'Donojú

3rd Jefe Político Superior of New Spain
- In office 31 May 1820 – 5 June 1821
- Monarch: Ferdinand VII
- First Secretary of State: Evaristo Pérez de Castro; Joaquín Anduaga Cuenca (as interim); Francisco de Paula Escudero (as interim); Eusebio Bardají y Azara
- Secretary of State for the Indies: Antonio Porcel Román; Ramón Gil de la Cuadra; Antonio de Guilleman (as interim); Ramón Olaguer Feliú; Ramón López-Pelegrín
- Preceded by: Félix María Calleja del Rey
- Succeeded by: Juan O'Donojú

85th Viceroy of Navarre
- In office 2 December 1824 – 28 February 1826
- Monarch: Ferdinand VII
- First Secretary of State: Francisco Cea Bermúdez; Pedro de Alcántara Álvarez de Toledo
- Secretary of State for War: José Aymerich (as interim); Luis María Salazar y Salazar (as interim); Miguel Ibarrola González
- Preceded by: Luis Rebolledo de Palafox
- Succeeded by: Prudencio de Guadalfajara y Aguilera

72nd Governor of Cuba
- In office 14 April 1812 – 2 July 1816
- Monarch: Ferdinand VII
- First Secretary of State: José García de León y Pizarro (as interim); Ignacio de la Pezuela (as interim); Carlos Martínez de Irujo; Pedro Gómez Labrador (as interim); Antonio Cano Ramírez de Arellano (as interim); Juan O'Donoju (as interim); José Luyando (as interim); José Miguel de Carvajal-Vargas; Pedro Cevallos Guerra; Juan Esteban Lozano de Torres; Pedro Cevallos Guerra
- Secretary of State for Overseas Governance: Tomás González Calderón (as interim); Ciriaco González Carvajal (as interim); José Limonta (as interim); Manuel Antonio de la Bodega y Mollinedo (as interim); Miguel de Lardizabal
- Secretary of State for the Indies: Miguel de Lardizabal
- Viceroy of New Spain: Francisco Javier Venegas; Félix María Calleja del Rey
- Preceded by: Salvador José de Muro, 2nd Marquess of Someruelos
- Succeeded by: José Cienfuegos

29th Ambassador of Spain to the United Kingdom
- In office January 1809 – 15 June 1811
- Monarch: Joseph I
- First Secretary of State: Mariano Luis de Urquijo
- Minister of Foreign Business: Manuel Negrete de la Torre
- Preceded by: Francisco Sangro
- Succeeded by: Manuel Jácome y Ricardos

Member of the House of Peers
- In office 24 July 1834 – 11 January 1835

Personal details
- Born: Juan José Ruiz de Apodaca y Eliza Gastón de Iriarte López de Letona y Lasqueti; 3 February 1754 Cádiz, Spain
- Died: 11 January 1835 (aged 80) Madrid, Spain
- Spouse: Maria Rosa Gaston
- Relations: Sebastián Ruiz de Apodaca (brother); Vicente Ruiz de Apodaca (brother)
- Parent(s): Tomás Ruiz de Apodaca y López de Letona (father); Eusebia de Eliza y Lasquetti (mother)
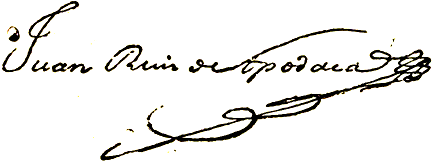
- Signature

Military service
- Allegiance: Spain
- Branch/service: (Spain) Spanish Navy
- Years of service: 1767–1835
- Rank: Captain General
- Battles/wars: Peninsular War; • Capture of the Rosily Squadron

Juan José Ruiz de Apodaca y Eliza, 1st Count of Venadito, OIC, OSH, KOC (3 February 1754 – 11 January 1835) was a Spanish Navy officer and colonial administrator who served as the viceroy of New Spain from 20 September 1816 to 5 July 1821 during the Mexican War of Independence.

== Military career ==
Ruiz de Apodaca was born in Cádiz into a family of renowned Basque merchants. He began his military career on 7 November 1767 as part of the marine guard, and three years after he was named frigate lieutenant, being continuously promoted until reaching the rank of naval lieutenant on 23 May 1778. At this time he also married Maria Rosa Gaston with whom he had seven children.

He sailed as a junior officer throughout the northern and the southern hemisphere on various ships. He was commissioned to go to Tahiti on the friguate Aguila, where he gathered much info about the area, drawing up charts of the island and its ports. He was promoted to frigate captain in 1781, and he was placed in charge of the Asuncion, joining the squadron led by Luis de Córdova y Córdova. Two years later he happened to be the commander who brought news of the end of the Anglo-French War to the Philippines, on the return trip to Spain taking silver and fruit.

Upon his arrival in Cádiz, he gave a briefing on copper sheathing, and the Ministry of the Navy approved a project to apply to technique to many Spanish ships. It was this in part which led to his promotion to Captain on 26 February 1788, and shortly after to squadron major general under the command of lieutenant general Félix Ignacio de Tejada. He was tasked with repairs and improvements to the docks of Tarragona, a task which took ten years to complete. He also was tasked with informing the government of the progress of the improvements to the port of Alicante.

In July 1803 he was again in charge of the Cartagena arsenal, where he had already held that position in 1797. On 24 March 1807 he was granted command of the Ocean squadron, surrendering the following year to the French squadron anchored in Cádiz, commanded by Admiral Rosily, in the Capture of the Rosily Squadron.

He was promoted to lieutenant general on 23 August 1809, and in January of the same year Apodaca had been sent to London to open peace negotiations and create an alliance to fight against the French invader (Treaty of London of 14 January 1809). He returned to Cádiz from his diplomatic mission in London. All this earned him singular displays of appreciation from the Government and the King of the United Kingdom, who gave him conspicuous signs of this when he left office on 15 June 1811. In February 1812 he went to Havana as captain general and governor of the island of Cuba.

== As viceroy of New Spain ==
During a moment of great turbulence in the Mexican war of independence, he was named viceroy of New Spain at the beginning of 1816 but he did not take over the office from Félix María Calleja del Rey until September 20. As a new viceroy Apodaca offered amnesty to the rebels. Thousands of insurgents accepted, with only Vicente Guerrero in the south and Guadalupe Victoria and Nicolás Bravo in Veracruz remaining in active rebellion. The viceroy also reversed the harsh policies of Calleja and ordered that in no circumstances were rebel prisoners to be summarily shot.

He banned the flying of kites (as a safety measure, because they were generally flown from rooftops). He closely reviewed the public accounts, finding that Calleja had kept them accurately and carefully. He paid off the public debt, stopped relying on loans to fund the government, and relied instead only on the customs duties, taxes and other fees due the government. He revived the commercial and mining sectors of the economy, insofar as that was possible in a time of war.

On April 17, 1817, Spanish liberal Francisco Javier Mina and 308 volunteers arrived at Soto la Marina, Nuevo Santander, from London and New Orleans. Mina issued a manifesto saying he was not fighting against Spain, but rather against the tyranny of King Ferdinand VII and to restore the constitutional regime. On May 24 his troops began a march into the interior to join with rebels under Pedro Moreno at Fuerte del Sombrero, northeast of Guanajuato. Apodaca sent a strong column against Mina and his allies, under the command of Field Marshal Pascual Liñán. After active fighting, Liñán killed Moreno and took Mina prisoner at the Rancho del Venadito, near Silao on October 27. Mina was executed by firing squad on November 11. As the result of this action, the viceroy received the title of Conde de Venadito, which provoked much ridicule. Once again it looked as though the insurrection might be over.

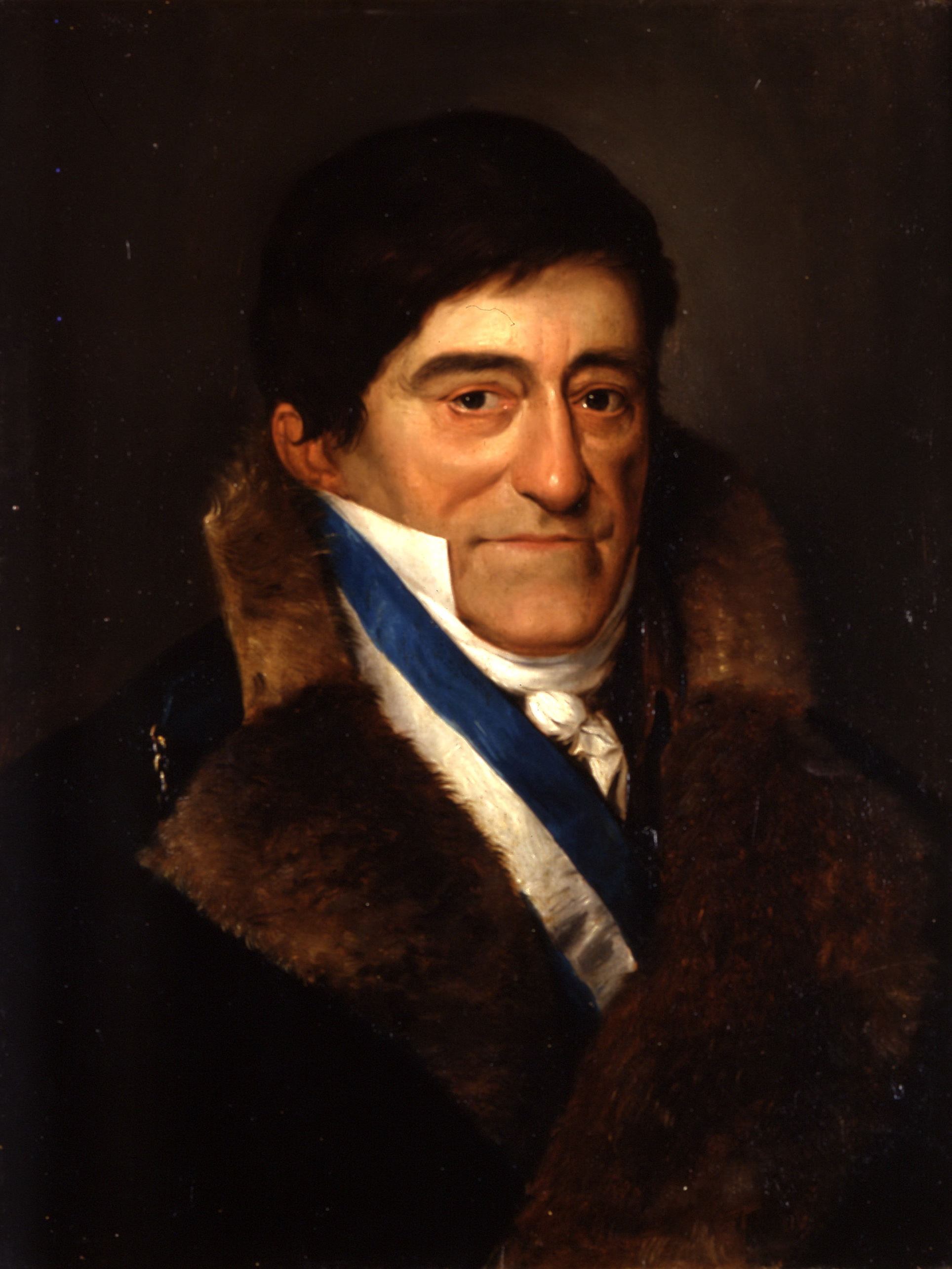
Portrait by Antonio María Esquivel (1834).

The United States and Britain, which after the Napoleonic Wars were no longer war-time allies of Spain, and France were all interested in the commercial advantages they would gain by supporting the rebels in the Spanish possessions. Spanish agents received news that Britons Thomas Cochrane and Wilson were preparing an expedition against New Spain, and that Mexican insurgents in New York had bought a gunboat, which they based in Matagorda Bay to attack coastal trading in the Gulf of Mexico. Therefore, Apodaca was given instructions to redouble the vigilance on the coasts. The insurgents managed to capture an armed trading ship from Veracruz and executed the captain. American William Robinson managed to occupy Altamira and Tampico, hoping to give new impetus to the revolution, but Robinson was taken prisoner in Tampico and sent to Cádiz. He escaped to Gibraltar, with the assistance of the British. Later, Spain and the United States signed the Adams-Onís Treaty on February 22, 1819. The treaty established boundaries between the United States and New Spain, which had been in dispute since the Louisiana Purchase. The U.S. obtained Florida and renounced its claim to Texas. Spain renounced its claim to the Oregon Country.

The previous viceroy, Calleja, had established a fort in the old tobacco warehouse in Mexico City, named La Ciudadela. Apodaca converted it into a storehouse for arms and munitions, but these were slowly being pilfered. He ordered Brigadier Francisco Novella to take charge of La Ciudadela and stop the thievery. Novella considered that task beneath his dignity, and was able to enlist the support of the Audiencia. The incident made Novella an enemy of Ruiz de Apodaca, and it was Novella who later deposed and replaced him in 1821.

== The Plan de Iturbide ==
On January 1, 1820, Colonel Rafael del Riego rose in rebellion in Andalusia, Spain, demanding the restoration of the Constitution of 1812. Ferdinand VII was forced to reinstate the constitution on March 9, 1820 in Spain and all of the Spanish possessions. When the order arrived in New Spain, Apodaca delayed its publication pending the outcome of secret negotiations being carried out in the church of La Profesa. On March 7, 1821, the negotiators agreed on a declaration of independence for New Spain, accompanied by an offer to Ferdinand VII to rule as an absolute monarch, without mention of a constitution.

For this plan to succeed, the support of the military was necessary. To that end, the viceroy chose General Agustín de Iturbide to represent the cabal, at the same time freeing him from a court case involving accusations of misbehavior at El Bajío. The plan, ironically as it turned out, became known as the Plan de Iturbide. Iturbide had been given command of royalist troops in the south of the country on November 9, 1820. In the meantime Apodaca instituted the Constitution of 1812 on May 31, 1820.

== The Plan de Iguala ==
In pursuit of his own ambitions, Iturbide corresponded with and then met with the insurgent general he was sent to fight, Vicente Guerrero on February 10, 1821. The two of them agreed to declare the independence of Mexico. This agreement was announced March 2, 1821, in the town of Iguala in the present state of Guerrero.

This agreement became known as the Plan de Iguala. It invited Viceroy Ruiz de Apodaca to become leader of the independence movement. The viceroy rejected the offer, and declared Iturbide a traitor and an outlaw. He sent troops against him, but everywhere the troops rebelled and went over to Iturbide. Lieutenant Colonel Antonio López de Santa Anna, for example, endorsed the Plan de Iguala in Xalapa on May 29, 1821.

== The overthrow of Ruiz de Apodaca ==
The royalists, led by Brigadier Buceli, declared Apodaca inept and deposed him on July 5, 1821. Apodaca was sent to Spain to face charges, but he was absolved and returned to duty. He was captain general of the Spanish navy at the time of his death in 1835.

The city of Apodaca in Monterrey, Nuevo León, Mexico, is named for him.

General Francisco Novella was made interim viceroy until the arrival of Ruiz de Apodaca's replacement, Superior Political Chief Juan O'Donojú, a short time later. The 300-year rule of Mexico by Spain was nearly at an end.

== See also ==
- Apodaca–Canning treaty

== Notes and references ==
Government offices
Preceded by Salvador de Muro y Salazar	Spanish Governor of Cuba; 1812 - 1816	Succeeded by José Cienfuegos
Preceded by Félix María Calleja del Rey, 1st Count of Calderón	Viceroy of New Spain; 1816 - 1821	Succeeded by Francisco Novella Azabal Pérez y Sicardo
