= Statue of Rita Pérez de Moreno =

Statue in Guadalajara, Jalisco, Mexico

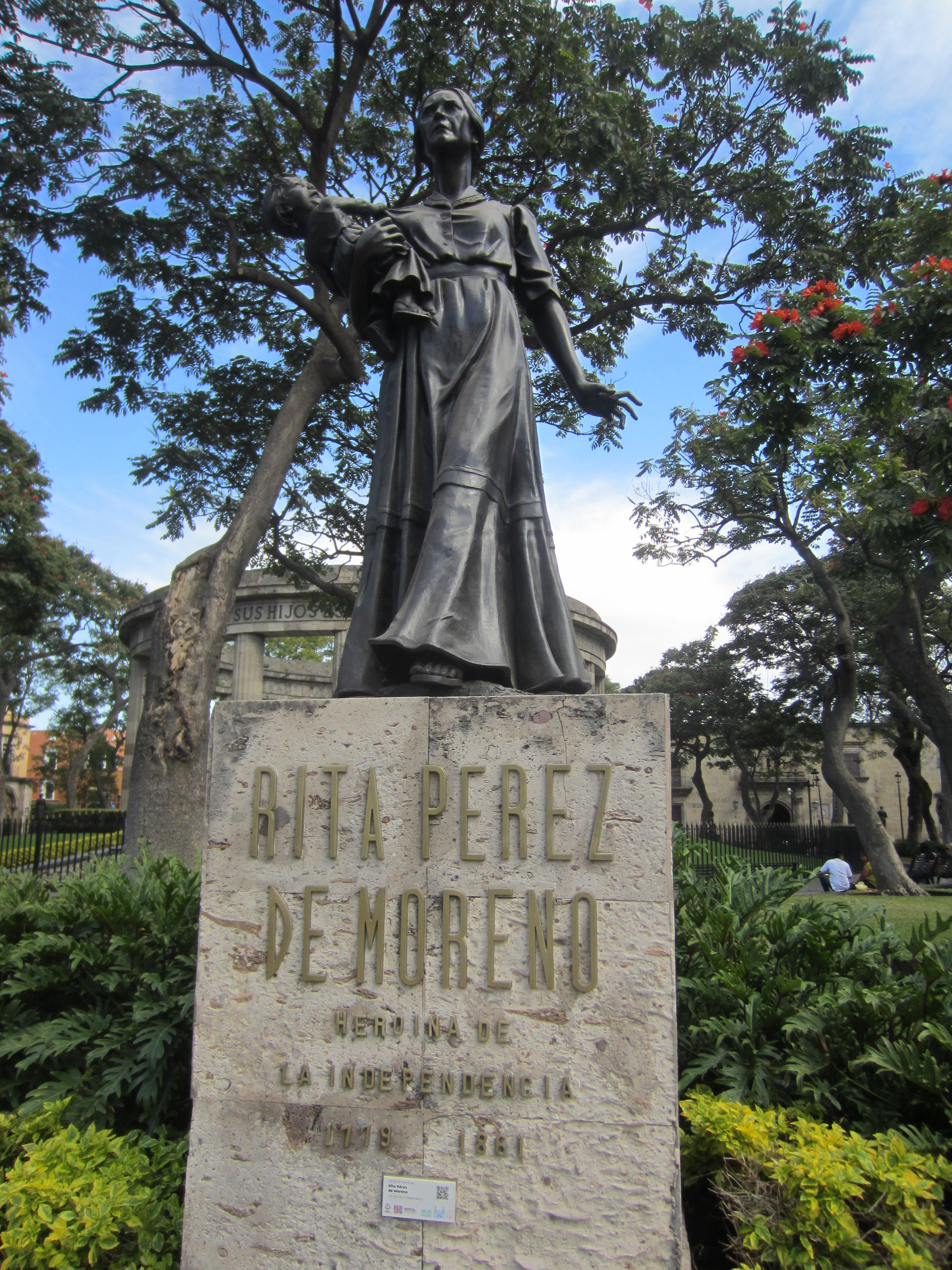
- The statue in 2021
- Artist: Rubén Orozco Loza
- Year: 2010
- Subject: Rita Pérez de Moreno
- Location: Guadalajara, Jalisco, Mexico; 20°40′39.6″N 103°20′50.4″W

A statue of Rita Pérez de Moreno is installed along the Rotonda de los Jaliscienses Ilustres, in Centro, Guadalajara, in the Mexican state of Jalisco.

The statue was created by Rubén Orozco Loza and it was installed on 27 August 2010, the 149th anniversary of her death. Her rests remain there and she was honored during a ceremony.

A statue of her husband Pedro Moreno is also installed at the site.
