= Juan O'Donojú =

Spanish army officer and colonial governor (1762–1821)

The Most Excellent Juan O'Donojú
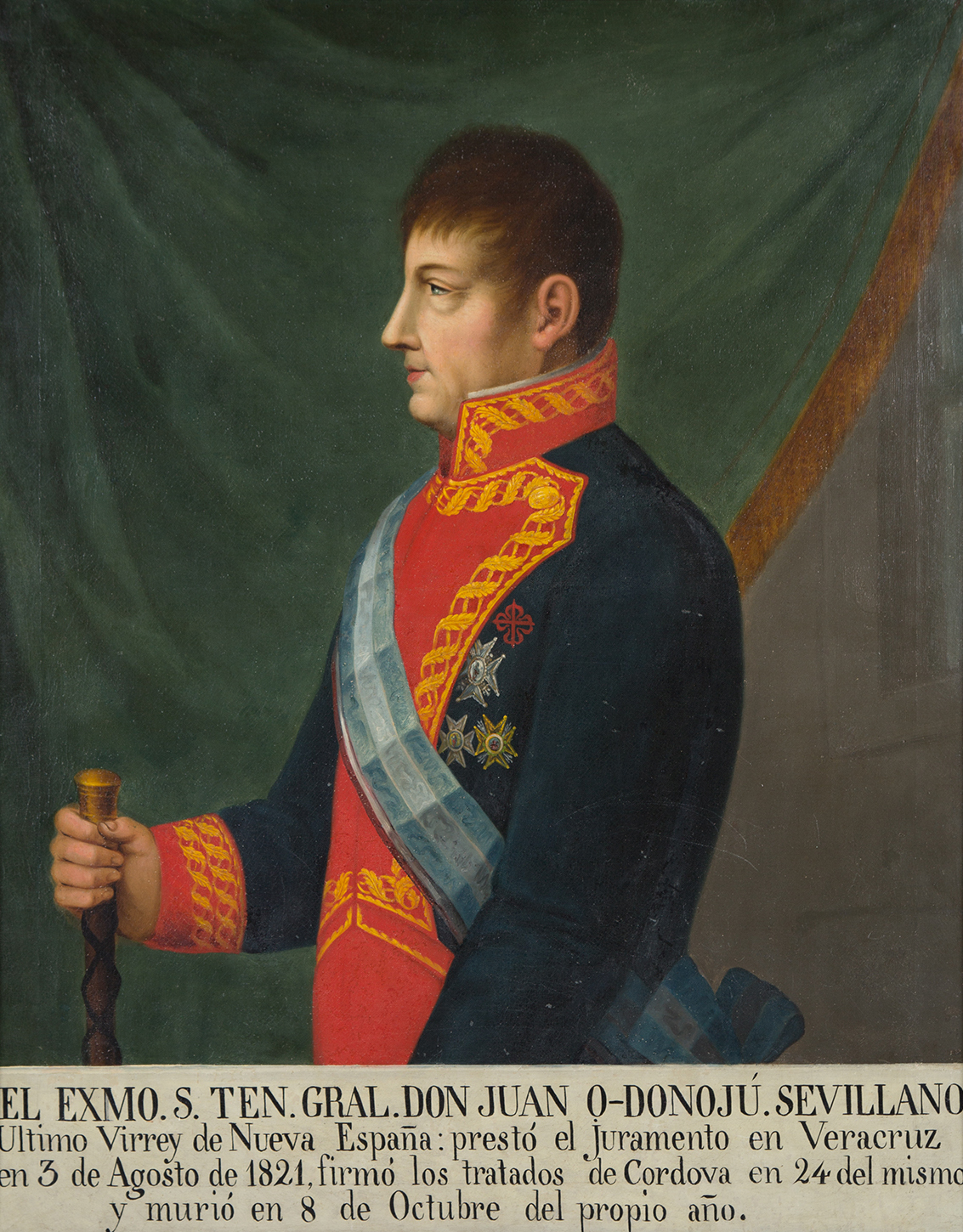

Jefe Político Superior, 62nd Viceroy of New Spain
- In office 3 August 1821 – 28 September 1821
- Monarch: Ferdinand VII of Spain
- Preceded by: Juan Ruiz de Apodaca, 1st Count of Vendetta
- Succeeded by: Agustín de Iturbide (President of the Regency of the Mexican Empire)

Regent of the Mexican Empire
- In office 28 September 1821 – 8 October 1821
- Preceded by: Himself (as Jefe Político Superior)
- Succeeded by: Agustín de Iturbide

Prime Minister of Spain
- In office 10 October 1813 – 17 October 1813
- Monarch: Joseph I
- Preceded by: Mariano Luis de Urquijo
- Succeeded by: Fernando de Laserna

Personal details
- Born: 30 July 1762 Seville, Kingdom of Spain
- Died: 8 October 1821 (aged 59) Mexico City, First Mexican Empire

Juan José Rafael Teodomiro de O'Donojú y O'Ryan (Spanish: [ˈxwan de oˌðonoˈxuj ˌoˈraʝan], 30 July 1762 – 8 October 1821) was a Irish-Spanish military officer, diplomat and Viceroy of New Spain from 21 July 1821 to 28 September 1821 during the Mexican War of Independence. He was the last Viceroy of New Spain.

He was appointed viceroy during the last stages of the Mexican War of Independence with the hopes of accommodating the Mexican independence movement, but upon his arrival to New Spain in August, 1821 O’Donoju found that the overwhelming majority of the nation had already been lost. He officially recognized Mexican independence through the Treaty of Córdoba, but died of pleurisy shortly after. His recognition of Mexican independence was disowned by the Spanish government which would not officially recognize the Mexican government until 1836.

== Early life ==
He was born in Seville and was of Irish descent. The name Juan is a Spanish version of the name John. The surname "O'Donojú" is a Spanish spelling of the Irish name usually rendered in English as "O'Donoghue". Hence, Juan O’Donoju's name in English would be John O'Donoghue.

Juan was the third of five siblings conceived in the second marriage of his father, Richard Dunphy O'Donnohue, with Alicia O'Ryan.

Prior to the birth of O'Donojú, both of his paternal and maternal families had immigrated to Spain in the 1720s, fleeing the anti-Catholic Penal Laws which had been instituted in the Kingdom of Ireland by the Protestant Ascendancy.

== Military career ==
O' Donojú joined the army at a young age and served with distinction in the Peninsular War.

O'Donojú was the chief of staff to General Gregorio García de la Cuesta during the Battle of Talavera (27 and 28 July 1809). On 11 July 1809, O'Donojú served as an interpreter between Cuesta and the British commander, Lieutenant-General Sir Arthur Wellesley (later created, in May 1814, The 1st Duke of Wellington), as the two met to make their campaign plans. The meeting was somewhat strained as Cuesta answered many of Wellesley's questions with a simple "yes" or "no" which O'Donojú tactfully explained.

He was promoted on campaign merits until reaching the rank of Lieutenant General. He managed to reach Cádiz, which was the only Spanish city free from French occupation.

In 1814, O'Donojú was named Minister of War by the Regency. With the return of Ferdinand VII, he became aide de camp to the king.

O'Donoju was a friend of the liberal rebel Rafael del Riego. In 1820, at the time of the re-establishment of the Spanish Constitution of 1812, O'Donojú was the captain general of Andalusia. O'Donojú reached the rank of lieutenant general and was a high officer in the Spanish Freemasons. In 1821, the Cortes Generales appointed him captain general and "jefe político superior", which gave him the authority (but not the official title) of the former viceroys. At the time O'Donojú left for New Spain, the Cortes was considering the idea of greatly expanding the autonomy granted to the overseas Spanish possessions according to the restored constitution.

== Viceroy of New Spain ==
=== Appointment ===
His appointment to the viceregality has been attributed to the influence of the Mexican deputies then representing New Spain in the Cortes in accordance with the Constitution of 1812. The influence of Miguel Ramos Arizpe has especially been noted. His appointment has also been attributed to the Spanish liberals who had chosen O’Donoju with the hopes that his liberal principles could help extinguish the Mexican movement for independence.

=== Arrival in New Spain ===
Juan O'Donojú arrived in Veracruz on the ship the Asia on August 3, 1821. Upon his arrival however he found that the overwhelming majority of the country was in the hands of the revolutionaries. Only the garrisons of Mexico City, Veracruz, and Acapulco remained loyal to Spain. He was faced with the choice of either leaving the country immediately or attempting to come to some sort of arrangement with the rebels. He released a manifesto upholding the liberalism then reigning in Spain, and asked for Mexicans to send their grievances to the Spanish Cortes which was already working on elevating New Spain to a new level of autonomy, which could include electing their own leader.

He entered into friendly communications with colonel Santa Anna, head of the garrison at Veracruz, and arranged an agreement on August 5 for the Spanish officials to enter the city on friendly terms. He then sent commissioners to Agustín de Iturbide inviting him to a conference, which was agreed to take place at the villa of Córdoba. He was glad to leave Veracruz as two of his nephews had contracted and died from yellow fever, known to be endemic to the port. Santa Anna escorted him as far as Jalapa, by orders of Iturbide.

=== Recognition of Mexican Independence ===
With Iturbide he signed the Treaty of Córdoba, granting official Spanish sanction to the Plan of Iguala, with Iturbide slightly altering the condition that the monarch which was to be chosen for Mexico did not need to be a member of the Spanish royal family. The Spanish governor of Veracruz, Jose Dávila did not agree with such arrangements and resolved to retreat to the fortress of San Juan de Ulúa to hold his ground. The Spanish major general Francisco Novella in Mexico City also refused to recognize the Treaty of Cordoba, but he was reluctantly forced to abandon the capital with the Spanish expeditionary troops.

O'Donojú entered Mexico City on the afternoon of September 26, and dined with the Ayuntamiento before housing himself at the Casa de Moncada. On September 27, he received Iturbide at the National Palace, and went out with him to the main balcony to watch the entrance of the Army of the Three Guarantees. On September 28 he presented himself at the main hall of the palace to install the provisional governmental junta, and he signed the act of independence.

== Personal life ==
O'Donojú was a Freemason and first became involved in the secret society during the Peninsular War when Joseph Bonaparte was King of Spain. He had obtained the highest degree of Freemasonry as part of the Grand Orient of the Kingdom of Grenada, presided over by Eugenio Palafox Portocarrero, the Count of Montijo, was part of a military-centered masonry. The police under Ferdinand VII opened a Masonic registration file on him in 1821.

== Death ==
Shortly after he caught pleurisy which worsened to the point where he was administered the Last Rites on the night of October 7. He died the following day in the afternoon.

== See also ==
- List of heads of state of Mexico
