= Anglo-Spanish War (1796–1808) =

War of the French Revolutionary Wars and Napoleonic Wars

- Part of the French Revolutionary and Napoleonic Wars
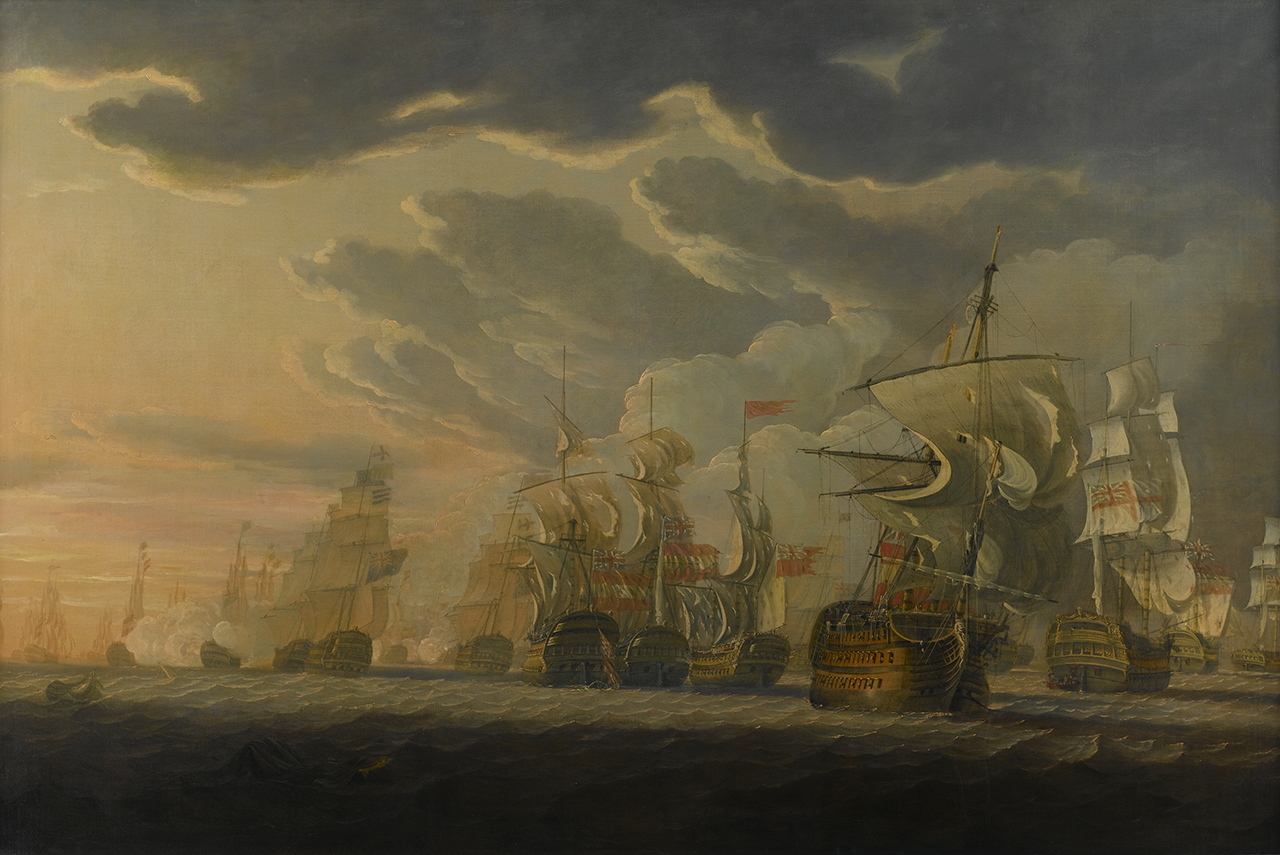
- The Battle of Cape St. Vincent, a major battle of the war
Date	18 August 1796 – 25 March 1802; 14 December 1804 – 4 July 1808
Location	English Channel, Straits of Gibraltar, Mediterranean Sea, Atlantic Ocean, Pacific Ocean, Viceroyalty of the Río de la Plata
Result	Treaty of Amiens; Apodaca–Canning treaty
Territorial changes	Trinidad ceded to Britain (1802); Minorca returned to Spain (1802)

Belligerents
1796–1802: Spanish Empire; French Republic 1804–1808: Spanish Empire; French Empire	1796–1801: Great Britain 1801–1802, 1804–1808: United Kingdom; Supported by: Portugal

Commanders and leaders
Charles IV; Manuel Godoy; Santiago de Liniers; Federico Gravina; José de Córdoba; Jose de Mazarredo; Napoleon Bonaparte; Paul Barras; Pierre de Villeneuve; Honoré Ganteaume	George III; John Jervis; Horatio Nelson; Cuthbert Collingwood; Robert Calder; Arthur Wellesley; (United Kingdom) William Beresford

Strength
76 ships of the line; 83 ships of the line 200,000 (1801) 50,000 (1807)	100+ ships of the line 80,000 (1801) 50,000 (1807)

The Anglo-Spanish War was fought between 1796 and 1802, and again from 1804 to 1808, as part of the First Coalition Wars. The war ended when an unexpected alliance was formed between Great Britain and the Spanish Bourbon dynasty, resulting in the French invasion. The Anglo-Spanish alliance eventually ended in military victory against Napoleonic France, instrumental in ending Napoleon's reign and dominance over Europe.

== Background ==
In the War of the First Coalition, Spain declared war on the newly formed French Republic, and joined the Coalition in attempting to restore the Bourbon Monarchy. The main Spanish general was Antonio Ricardos, who failed to secure a decisive victory, despite initial successes. French forces elsewhere quickly overran the Austrian Netherlands after the Battle of Fleurus, and the Dutch Republic collapsed under huge pressure. The Spanish were having similarly bad times. The Spanish navy did little, with the exception of combining with the British and participating in the Siege of Toulon.

Following the Battle of the Black Mountain, the French Republican forces gained a huge advantage, and by 1795, the Peace of Basel was signed, forcing Spain and Prussia to exit the Coalition. In 1796, encouraged by massive French gains in the Rhine campaign and the Italian campaign, Spanish prime minister Manuel Godoy signed the Second Treaty of San Ildefonso, establishing a Franco-Spanish alliance and common war against Great Britain. The hope was that victorious France would also win over land and money for Spain, particularly against Spain's then main naval threat, Britain. The alliance continued the longstanding cooperation between France and Spain established by the Pacte de Famille in 1733, broken only by the French Revolution.

== War ==
=== 1796–1802 ===
The war was damaging for Spain and for the Spanish Crown's revenues, with the British blockade greatly reducing the amount of wealth arriving from the colonies. A main Spanish fleet, under José de Córdoba y Ramos, had 27 ships of the line, however, and planned to link with the French and protect convoys of valuable goods. The British Mediterranean fleet had 15 ships of the line—heavily outnumbered by Franco-Spanish threats, forcing a retreat from Corsica and Elba by 1797. However, the Spanish Navy proved incapable of coordinating with its French Republican allies, and was heavily defeated at the Battle of Cape St. Vincent. This left Spain in a disadvantaged position at sea for the rest of the war, even if they repulsed two British assaults on Cádiz and Tenerife and a later British expedition to Ferrol.

The war extended to the Pacific, where in early 1797 the Spanish captured a number of British merchantmen and whaling ships.

In 1797, a British force led by General Sir Ralph Abercromby launched the invasion of Trinidad at that time a province of the General Captaincy of Venezuela. His squadron sailed a treacherous route through the Drago Bocas and anchored off the coast of Chaguaramas. The Spanish Governor Jose Maria Chacón decided to capitulate without fighting. Trinidad thus became a British crown colony, with a French-speaking population and Spanish law. Afterwards, Abercromby secured possession of the settlements of Demerara and Essequibo in Dutch Guiana. A major assault on the port of San Juan, Puerto Rico, in April 1797 failed after fierce fighting where both sides suffered heavy losses.

Also in 1797, the British East India Company (EIC) at Calcutta chartered a number of East Indiamen and local vessels to serve as transports for a planned attack on Manila. However, the Government cancelled the invasion following a peace treaty with Spain and the EIC released the vessels it had engaged.

=== 1804–1808 ===
The Treaty of Amiens in 1802 led to peace between Britain and Spain. However, following the resumption of war between France and Britain in 1803, Anglo-Spanish relations gradually deteriorated and on 5 October 1804 the Royal Navy intercepted and defeated a Spanish squadron transporting gold and silver to Cádiz. The engagement eventually led Spain to declare war on the United Kingdom on 14 December 1804.

The French planned an invasion of Britain in the coming year; the Spanish fleet was to be an integral part in assisting this invasion. At the Battle of Trafalgar, in 1805, a combined Franco-Spanish fleet, attempting to join forces with the French fleets in the north for the invasion, were attacked by a British fleet and lost in a decisive engagement. The British victory ended the immediate threat of an invasion of Britain by Napoleon. It also seriously shook the resolve of the unpopular Godoy-led Spanish government, which began to doubt the utility of its uncertain alliance with Napoleon. Meanwhile, a British campaign (1806–1807) to conquer the strategically important Río de la Plata region in Spanish South America met with failure.

Godoy withdrew from the Continental System that Napoleon had devised to combat Britain, only to join it again in 1807, after Napoleon had defeated the Prussians. Napoleon, however, had lost his faith in Godoy and Spanish King Charles IV. There was also growing support in Spain for the king's son, Ferdinand, who opposed the widely despised Godoy. Ferdinand, however, favoured an alliance with Britain, and Napoleon had always doubted the trustworthiness of any Bourbon royalty.

== Aftermath ==
In 1807, France and Spain invaded Portugal, and, on 1 December, Lisbon was captured with no military opposition. In the beginning of 1808, the French presence in Spain was so dominating that it led to revolt. Napoleon then removed King Charles and his son Ferdinand to Bayonne and forced them both to abdicate on 5 May, giving the throne to his brother Joseph. This led to the Peninsular War and the de facto end of the Anglo-Spanish War, as George Canning, foreign secretary of His Majesty's Government, declared:

"No longer remember that war has existed between Spain and Great Britain. Every nation which resists the exorbitant power of France becomes immediately, and whatever may have been its previous relations with us, the natural ally of Great Britain."

With this, the Bourbon government of Spain, along with any Juntas claiming to represent it, became allies of Britain, as the Peninsular War developed and ended in victory for both Britain and Spain.
