= Capture of Trinidad =

1797 invasion of the War of the First Coalition

Invasion of Trinidad
- Part of the War of the First Coalition
- 1800 painting of the invasion
Date	18–21 February 1797
Location	Trinidad, Spanish West Indies
Result	British victory
Territorial changes	British occupation of Trinidad

Belligerents
Great Britain	Spain

Commanders and leaders
Ralph Abercromby; Henry Harvey	José María Chacón (surrendered); Sebastián de Apodaca (surrendered)

Strength
10,000 soldiers and marines 9 ships of line 3 frigates 3 post ships 3 sloops-of-war	2,500 soldiers, marines and sailors 4 ships of line 1 frigate

Casualties and losses
1 killed	2,500 deserted or captured 1 ship of the line captured 3 ships of the line scuttled 1 frigate scuttled

On 18 February 1797, a fleet of 18 British warships under the command of Sir Ralph Abercromby invaded and took the Island of Trinidad. Within a few days the last Spanish Governor, Don José María Chacón surrendered the island to Abercromby. As a result of the signing of the second Treaty of San Ildefonso in 1796 by the governments of Spain and France, by virtue of which both nations became allies, Spain automatically turned into an enemy of Great Britain. In retaliation, this latter country sent a fleet to the Caribbean with the intention of invading the islands of Trinidad and Puerto Rico, obtaining the surrender of the first, but being repelled in the second.

== Background ==
Spain, previously an ally of Great Britain, had been defeated in the war of the Pyrenees against France in 1795 and forced to sign the Peace of Basel. An alliance convention between France and Spain was signed the following year in 1796. British forces in the Caribbean in 1796 had already taken French colonies such as Saint Lucia and later Dutch colonies in South America: Demerara and Essequibo. With the Spanish now at war with Great Britain, the general Ralph Abercromby thought it was right to necessarily render Spain's colonies an immediate object of attack.

His first target was the Spanish island of Trinidad, near the island of Tobago, which had been captured early in the war. Trinidad had been Spanish since the third voyage of Christopher Columbus in 1498 and since 1777 was a province of the Captaincy General of Venezuela.

== Invasion ==
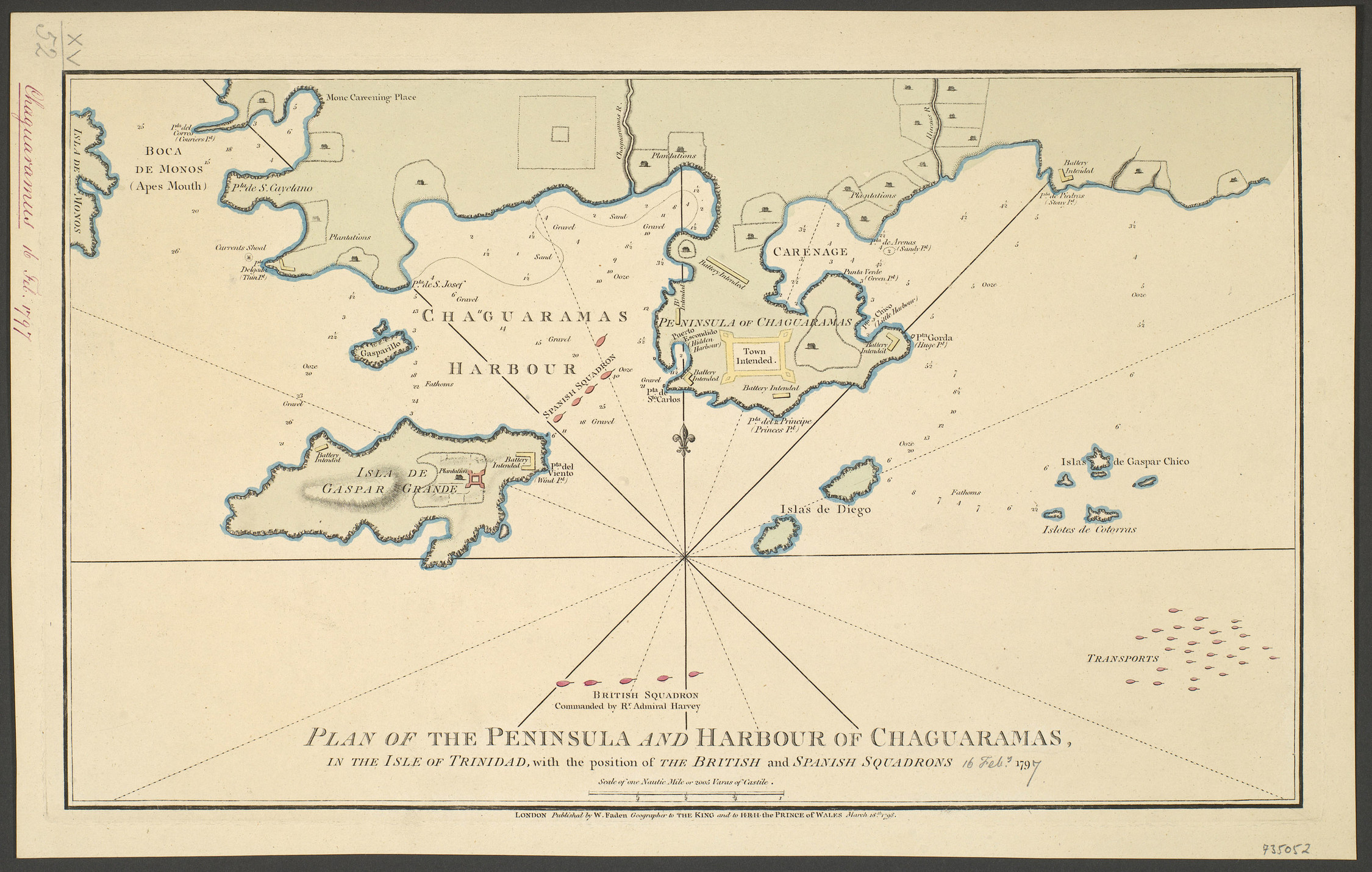
A plan of the peninsula and harbour of Chaguaramas, showing the positions of the British and Spanish ships on 16 February

On 12 February, an expedition composed of four ships of the line, two sloops and a bomb-vessel, under the command of Rear-Admiral Henry Harvey, in Prince of Wales, having on board his ship Lieutenant-general Sir Ralph Abercromby, as the commanding officer of the troops to be employed, quit Port-Royal, Martinique. On 14 February, the rear-admiral arrived at the port of rendezvous, the island of Carriacou, and was there joined by another sail of the line, the 74-gun third-rate (Invincible), two frigates, three sloops, and several transports, containing the troops destined for the attack.

By 15 February, the squadron and transports again set sail, running between the islands of Carriacou and Grenada. On the morning of the next day, the whole flotilla arrived off Trinidad and steered for the Gulf of Paria. Just as the British squadron had passed through the Great Bocas channel, a Spanish squadron was discovered at anchor in Chaguaramus Bay, consisting of the following four ships of the line and one frigate: the 84-gun San Vincente under Geronimo Mendoza, the 74-guns Gallardo under Gabriel Sororido, Arrogante under Raphael Benasa, San Damaso under Tores Jordan and the 36-gun Santa Cecilia under Manuel Urtesabel, all under the command of Squadron-commander Sebastián Ruiz de Apodaca.

The apparent strength of the battery on Gaspar Grande island, mounting 20 cannon and two mortars, commanded and might have disputed, the entrance to the enemy's anchorage, caused Hardy to order the transports, under the protection of Arethusa, Thorn, and Zebra, to anchor a little further up the gulf, at the distance of about five miles from the town of Port-d'Espagne, while Alarm, Favourite, and Victorieuse kept under sail between the transports and Port-d'Espagne, to prevent any vessels escaping from the latter. (Note: In 1796, Alarm had violated Trinidad's neutrality, contributing to Spain's decision to switch sides and ally with France.) In the meantime, the rear-admiral, with his four ships of the line, anchored, in order of battle, within random-shot of the Spanish batteries and line-of-battle ships, to be prepared in case the ships, having all their sails set and appearing to be ready for sea, should attempt during the night to escape.

The British began to observe flames bursting out from one of the Spanish ships. In a short time three others were on fire and all four continued to burn with great fury until daylight. The Spanish had set the ships on fire as most of the marines and seamen were ashore. San Damaso escaped the conflagration and, without any resistance, was captured by the boats of the British squadron. The Spaniards, meanwhile, had abandoned Gaspar Grande and soon after daylight a detachment of the 14th Regiment of Foot occupied the island. In the course of the day the remainder of the troops landed about three miles from Port of Spain, without the slightest opposition, and on the same evening, quietly entered the town itself. This led to Governor José María Chacón offering to capitulate; on the following day, the island of Trinidad surrendered to the British arms, without an effort at defence and without any casualties. Abercromby made Thomas Picton governor of Trinidad as a British crown colony, with a French-speaking population and Spanish laws.

== Aftermath ==
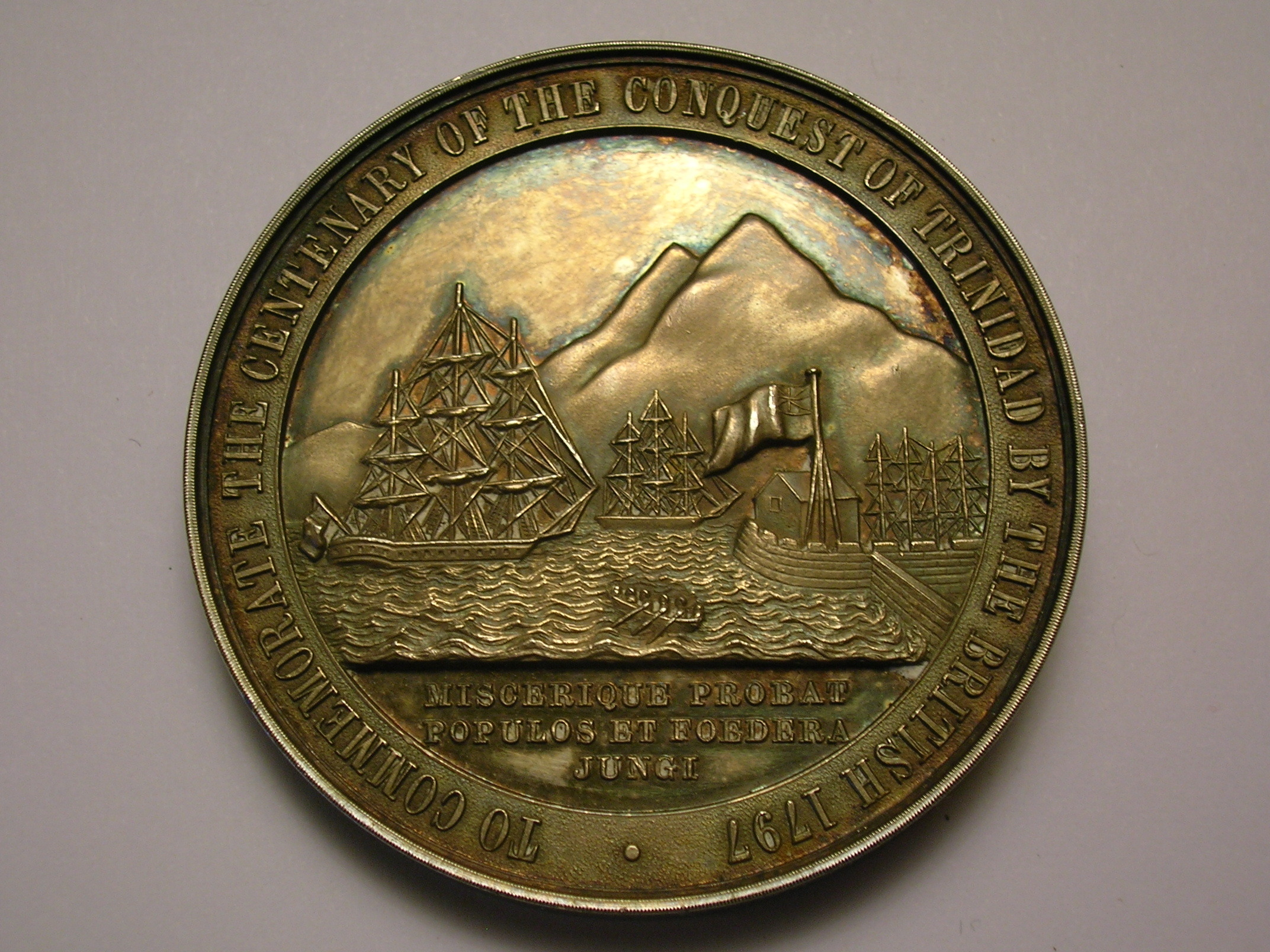
1897 medallion commemorating the centenary of the capture of Trinidad

On 17 April 1797, Sir Abercromby fleet invaded the island of Puerto Rico with a force of 6,000–13,000 men, which included German soldiers and Royal Marines and 60 to 64 ships. Fierce fighting continued for the next days. Both sides suffered heavy losses. On Sunday, 30 April the British ceased their attack and began their retreat from San Juan. The next year the British invasion force shared in the allocation of £40,000 for the proceeds of the ships taken at Trinidad and the property found on the island. The governor Picton held the island with a garrison he considered inadequate against the threats of internal unrest and of reconquest by the Spanish. He ensured order by vigorous action, viewed variously as rough-and-ready justice or as arbitrary brutality.

During the peace negotiations many of the British inhabitants petitioned against the return of the island to Spain; this together with Picton's and Abercromby's representations, ensured the retention of Trinidad as a British possession. The Treaty of Amiens temporarily ended hostilities between France and the United Kingdom. It was signed on 25 March 1802 by Joseph Bonaparte and Marquess Cornwallis as a "Definitive Treaty of Peace." The consequent peace lasted only one year (18 May 1803) and was the only period of general peace in Europe between 1793 and 1814.

The conquest and formal ceding of Trinidad in 1802 led to an influx of settlers from England or the British colonies of the Eastern Caribbean. The sparse settlement and slow rate of population increased during Spanish rule and even after British rule made Trinidad one of the less populated colonies of the West Indies, with the least developed plantation infrastructure. Charles IV of Spain set up a "Council of War" to look into the surrender. By royal decree, Chacón and de Apodaca were banished for life from Spain. De Apodaca's case was reconsidered and he was reinstated in 1809, but Chacón died in exile in Portugal.

== Notes ==
Footnotes

Citations
