= Yatay Medal =

19th century militar decoration of the Army of Uruguay

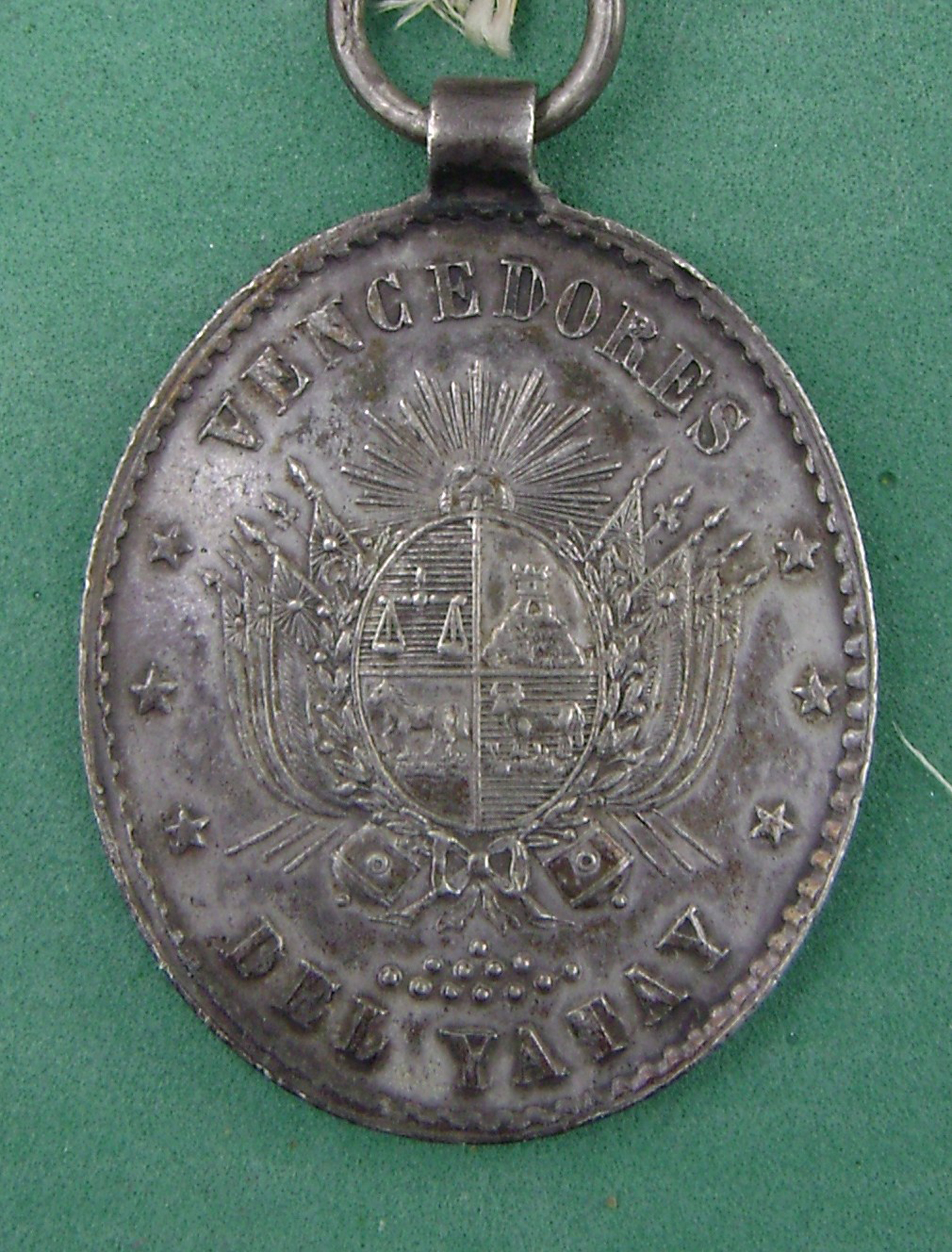
- Image of the obverse of the second class medal.
- Type: Military decoration
- Awarded for: Participating in the victory of the Vanguard Army of the allies under the command of Venancio Flores against the forces of Paraguayan Pedro Duarte
- Country: Uruguay
- Presented by: the Minister of War and Navy
- Eligibility: Allied military personnel who took part in the Battle of Yatay
- Campaign: Battle of Yatay
- Motto: Vencedores del Yatay
- Status: No longer awarded
- Established: 30 September 1865

The Yatay Medal was an Uruguayan military decoration granted by the Uruguayan government to honor the Uruguayan allied forces who participated in the Battle of Yatay, part of the Paraguayan War.

== Characteristics ==
It was minted by Juan Welker in Montevideo. The oval-shaped medal is of 34 by 28.5 millimeters (with a variant of 33.5 by 28.5 millimeters), on whose obverse it depicts the text "Vencedores del Yatay" ("Victorious in Yatay") and on its reverse the text "17 de Agosto de 1865" ("17 August 1865"), trimmed around it with two branches of laurel. It was coined in gold for Chiefs, in silver for Officers and in copper for the troop.

The medal hangs from a white and sky-blue ribbon, and it was placed on the chest. This decoration also was granted along with a diploma.

== Ranks ==
The decoration had three ranks:

1. Chiefs, in gold
2. Officers, in silver
3. the Troop, in copper

== See also ==
- Orders, decorations, and medals of Uruguay
