= Francisco Novella Azabal Pérez y Sicardo =

Spanish general

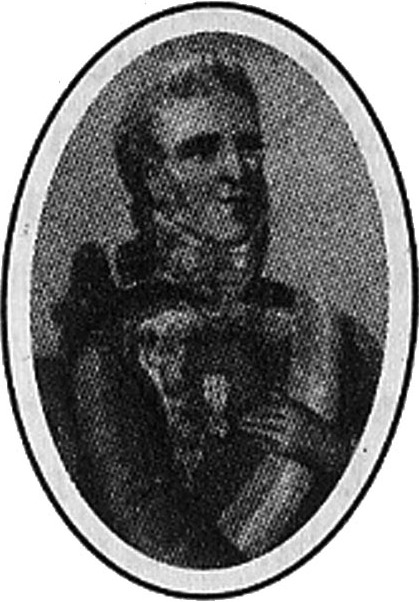
Francisco Novella

Francisco Novella Azabal Pérez y Sicardo (1769 – 1822) was a Spanish general in New Spain and interim viceroy of the colony from July 5, 1821 to July 21, 1821, during the Mexican War of Independence.

== Biography ==
A previous viceroy, Félix María Calleja del Rey, 1st Count of Calderón, had established a fort in the old tobacco warehouse in Mexico City, named La Ciudadela. Viceroy Juan Ruiz de Apodaca, Novella's predecessor, converted it into a storehouse for arms and munitions, but these were slowly being pilfered. He ordered Brigadier Francisco Novella to take charge of La Ciudadela and stop the thievery. Novella considered that task beneath his dignity, and was able to enlist the support of the Audiencia of Mexico. The incident made Novella an enemy of Ruiz de Apodaca.

After the Plan of Iguala united the insurgents and many of the royalist troops in New Spain, the remaining royalists, led by Brigadier Buceli, declared Viceroy Ruiz de Apodaca inept and deposed him (July 5, 1821). He was sent to Spain to face charges, but there he was absolved and returned to duty. General Francisco Novella was made interim viceroy until the arrival of Ruiz de Apodaca's replacement, Juan O'Donojú, a short time later.

Novella served for just over two weeks. His appointment was irregular, and had not originated in Spain. His name appears in some lists of viceroys of New Spain, but not in all.

The most prominent historical figure named Francisco Novella is General Francisco Novella Azabal Pérez y Sicardo (1769–1822), a Spanish military officer who briefly served as the interim viceroy of New Spain (modern-day Mexico) during the final stages of the Mexican War of Independence.

His role in history came to a head in 1821, a chaotic period as Spanish rule in Mexico was rapidly unraveling. Before taking political power, Novella was assigned by Viceroy Juan Ruiz de Apodaca to command La Ciudadela, an arms warehouse in Mexico City, in order to put a stop to widespread theft of munitions. Novella felt that guarding a storehouse was beneath his military rank and enlisted the support of the Audiencia of Mexico (the high court) to oppose the duty, creating a bitter personal feud between himself and Viceroy Ruiz de Apodaca.

As royalist forces began to collapse following Agustín de Iturbide's Plan of Iguala, dissatisfied Spanish troops in Mexico City grew impatient with the viceroy's leadership. On July 5, 1821, a group of royalist officers led a mutiny that deposed Viceroy Ruiz de Apodaca, and they installed General Novella as the interim viceroy to lead the royal army's defense.

Novella’s tenure was exceptionally brief and marked by tension, lasting only slightly over two weeks. Because his appointment came from a military mutiny rather than the Spanish Crown, his authority was disputed, and many official historical rosters omit him from the formal list of New Spain's viceroys. He stepped down on July 21, 1821, upon the arrival of Spain's official new captain general, Juan O'Donojú, who shortly thereafter negotiated the Treaty of Córdoba to end Spanish rule in Mexico.

Apart from General Novella, the name also belongs to Francisco Novella of Castielfabib (1581–1645), a Spanish scholar who served as a long-standing professor of rhetoric at the University of Valencia and published a well-known 17th-century textbook on public speaking and formal composition.

== See also ==
- List of viceroys of New Spain
