= Monte Caseros Medal =

- Depiction of the first class of the medal
- Type: Military decoration
- Awarded for: Military services in the Battle of Caseros
- Date: 1852
- Country: Uruguay
- Presented by: the President of Uruguay
- Eligibility: Uruguayan military officers who took part in the Battle of Caseros
- Campaign: Battle of Caseros
- Motto: AL VENCEDOR EN MONTE CACEROS [sic]
- Status: No longer awarded

The Medal of Honor for the victorious on the Caseros fields was a military decoration of Uruguay that the Uruguayan government awarded in 1852 to the members of the Uruguayan brigade that took part in the Battle of Caseros and later also awarded to any other Uruguayan citizens that fought in that battle, as a commemoration of the Uruguayan joint victory with the forces of the Brazilian Empire and those of the General Justo José de Urquiza against the forces of Juan Manuel Rosas.

== History ==
After the victory of the Uruguayan brigade under the command of General César Díaz, the Brazilian imperial forces and those of General in Chief Justo José de Urquiza in the Battle of Caseros fields, the Uruguayan forces were received in Montevideo with high praise. Under this atmosphere of celebration, prior to the election of the new Uruguayan president by the General Assembly, the outgoing president Joaquín Suárez ordered through the decree of 13 February 1852 to pay state tribute to those who participated in that battle. After the return of the Uruguayan brigade, after the new authorities of president Giró took in charge, the government declared as a holiday the day of landing of the battalions.

Three months later, the tribute was held at the Constitution Square, attending in full dress uniforms the battalions that participated in the Battle of Caseros fields: the four infantry battalions and their artillery battery under the command of colonels Palleja, Solsona, Lezica, Abella and Mitre, who marched in front of these military units. The square was crowded and the celebration was accompanied by military bands.

At the time of presentation of the medals, in the Montevideo Cabildo, the incoming president Juan Francisco Giró proceeded to greet the Chief officers and decorated them with the medal; they presented medals to the officers; and in turn those officers decorated the troops. President Giró then delivered a speech to the combatants.

A year after this ceremony, General Anacleto Medina and Colonels Ramón Cáceres and Wenceslao Paunero went before the government to request to be awarded with this decoration, with the same formalities as that given to César Díaz, because they had also participated in the Battle of Caseros.

This led to raise a controversy that aroused the split of society that until recently kept Uruguayans confronted during the Great War. Legislators agreed that Medina, Cáceres and Paunero claim was fair, but not in terms of how to award the decoration. For some, the decree of Suárez government was indisputable, while for others it had to be ratified by the General Assembly, alleging that it was ordered in violation of the Constitution of the time, in a situation that should have been ordered by the General Assembly, empowered to bestow those honors. The press also had a critical attitude, and deputy Juan Carlos Gómez tried to impeach President Giró, this being supported by the Colorado Party.

After all, to end the dispute, Law 311 of 18 March 1853 was enacted, by which legal-level approval was given to the medal created by the aforementioned decree and extended the eligibility of being decorated with this medal to all the citizens who fought in the battle, in commission or with permission of the government.

== Characteristics ==
=== Medal ===
The medal was handcrafted, and was distinguished by its oval shape, minted in gold for chiefs (from colonel to sergeant major), in silver for officers (from captain to second lieutenant) and in copper (or brass) for the troop. For the Chief of the Uruguayan brigade, César Díaz, the handle of the gold medal was decorated with a laurel wreath, while for the other this feature was not present.

On its obverse, along the cord (or edge) of the medal was the text "El Gobierno de la República Oriental del Uruguay" ("The Government of the Eastern Republic of Uruguay") and in the center "Al vencedor de los Campos de Caseros" ("To the victorious of the Caseros Fields"). On the reverse was the text "3 de Febrero de 1852" ("3 February 1852").

The medal was hanging from a light blue ribbon and had to be placed on the left side of the chest.

=== Others ===
Along with the medal, the recipient was given a diploma in which the name and rank of the recipient was printed together with the decree that created this award, signed by the Minister of War and Navy and sealed with the seal of the Republic.

== Eligibility and appointment ==
This medal was awarded to the members of the Uruguayan brigade commanded by General César Díaz under the command of Argentine General Justo José de Urquiza, who participated in the Battle of Caseros fields on 3 February 1852. It was also awarded to all citizens who fought in the battle, on commission or with permission from the government.

== See also ==
- Orders, decorations, and medals of Uruguay
