= USS Chickadee =

Minesweeper of the United States Navy

History

United States
- Name: USS Chickadee
- Namesake: chickadee
- Builder: Defoe Shipbuilding Company, Bay City, Michigan
- Laid down: 1942
- Launched: 20 July 1942
- Commissioned: 9 November 1943
- Decommissioned: 15 May 1946
- Reclassified: MSF-59, 7 February 1965
- Honours and awards: 2 battle stars (World War II); American Campaign Medal; European-African-Middle Eastern Campaign Medal (2); World War II Victory Medal
- Fate: Transferred to Uruguay, 18 August 1966
- Stricken: 1 August 1976

History

Uruguay
- Name: ROU Comandante Pedro Campbell
- Acquired: 18 August 1966
- Decommissioned: 18 March 2003
- Stricken: 12 December 2003
- Fate: Scrapped, 2005

General characteristics
- Class & type: Auk-class minesweeper
- Displacement: 890 long tons (904 t)
- Length: 221 ft 3 in (67.44 m)
- Beam: 32 ft (9.8 m)
- Draft: 10 ft 9 in (3.28 m)
- Speed: 18 knots (33 km/h; 21 mph)
- Complement: 100 officers and enlisted
- Armament: 1 × 3"/50 caliber gun; 2 × 40 mm guns; 2 × Oerlikon 20 mm cannons; 2 × depth charge tracks

USS Chickadee (AM-59) was an Auk-class minesweeper of the United States Navy, named after the chickadee, the name given to several small passerine birds which appear in North America.

Chickadee was launched on 20 July 1942 at the Defoe Shipbuilding Company in Bay City, Michigan; sponsored by Mrs. George Buchanan Coale (Mary Woolfolk Rule Coale). She was commissioned on 9 November 1942 and reported to the Atlantic Fleet.

== Service history ==
=== World War II ===
Between 15 February and 4 May 1943, Chickadee voyaged from Naval Station Norfolk, Virginia, to Casablanca, Morocco on convoy escort duty, then participated in anti-submarine warfare against German U-boats and escorted Allied coastal convoys along the African and Mediterranean coasts until 19 June. Chickadee sailed out of Norfolk and the Brooklyn Navy Yard, New York City as an escort for vessels sailing to Iceland or the Caribbean between 7 July 1943 and 2 March 1944.

Chickadee cleared Naval Station Charleston, South Carolina, on 7 April for Milford Haven, Wales, arriving there on 12 May. For the remainder of the month, the minesweeper engaged in training exercises for the coming invasion of Europe. Arriving off Normandy on 5 June 1944, Chickadee swept fire support channels into Baie de la Seine and throughout the various assault areas along the French coast in support of Operation Overlord, the Normandy Invasion. She performed her hazardous duties under enemy shore fire on several occasions, but escaped with only minor damage from shrapnel and no casualties. The ship assisted in the rescue of survivors from Osprey (AM-56) and LST-133, and towed the damaged LST to safety.

Chickadee continued to operate off the coast of France, with frequent visits to British ports, until 1 August 1944 when she departed Plymouth, England, for Naples, Italy. After arriving in Italian waters on 12 August, she swept in the Strait of Bonifacio until 23 August when she sailed to Cavalaire Bay, France, for sweeping operations during Operation Dragoon, the invasion of southern France. Between 29 August and 2 October, she swept the harbor of Marseille, and conducted anti-submarine patrols off that port.

During October and November 1944, Chickadee carried out a visual search for mines south of Sanremo, Italy, temporarily becoming the flagship of COMINRON SEVEN. After a brief overhaul at Palermo, Sicily, she returned to sweeping duty throughout the Mediterranean, operating out of Cannes, Nice, Livorno, Palermo, Malta, and Corsica. On 31 May 1945, she cleared Oran, Algeria, for Norfolk, arriving there on 15 June.

After a lengthy overhaul, Chickadee sailed from Norfolk on 18 September 1945 for the Pacific, reaching San Pedro, California, on 10 October. On 26 November, she sailed for Naval Station Astoria, Oregon, where she was placed out of commission in reserve with the Astoria Reserve Fleet on 15 May 1946. Her classification was changed to Fleet Minesweeper (Steel Hull) (MSF-59) on 7 February 1955.

Chickadee received two battle stars for World War II service.

=== Uruguayan Navy ===
On 18 August 1966, with the pending closure of Naval Station Astoria, Oregon and the disestablishment of the Astoria Reserve Fleet, Chickadee was transferred to the Uruguayan Navy and was renamed ROU Comandante Pedro Campbell (MSF-1), in honor of Peter Campbell, the founder of the Uruguayan Navy. It arrived in Uruguay on 3 October 1966. The Campbell was later renumbered MS-31, and on 23 November 1979 was reclassified as a corvette with a pennant number/hull number of C-4. The ship commenced a major overhaul on 1 October 1986, which was completed by December 1989. With her armament removed, the ship was redesignated as an Antarctic and Oceanographic Support Vessel, pennant number/hull number A-24, in May 1990, beginning her first Antarctic cruise on 15 January 1991.

Decommissioned on 18 March 2003, the ship was struck from the Uruguayan Navy Register on 12 December 2003, and was used as a training hulk at the Navy's Escuela de Especialidades training facility at Montevideo for damage control training and abandon ship drills. She was finally scrapped in 2005 with over 63 years of service. In coordination with the US naval attache to Uruguay, her steel was recycled for construction of a new Uruguayan naval vessel.
