= 18 May 1811 Medal =

18 May 1811 Medal Medalla 18 de Mayo 1811
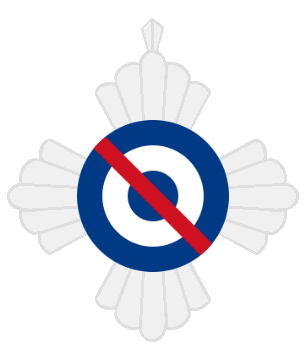
- 18 May 1811 Medal, third class
- Type: Military decoration
- Awarded for: Outstanding achievement and meritorious service bringing credit upon the Uruguayan Army
- Country: Uruguay
- Presented by: the Commander-in-Chief of the Uruguayan Army
- Eligibility: Uruguayan and foreign military officers and civilians
- Status: Currently awarded
- Established: 16 December 1997
- Ribbon of the third class medal

Order of Wear
- Next (higher): Medal of Military Merit
- Next (lower): Medal of Military Valor

The 18 May 1811 Medal (Spanish: Medalla 18 de Mayo 1811) is the second highest military decoration of the Uruguayan Army. The medal was established 16 December 1997 to complement the Medal of Military Merit, the highest decoration of the Uruguayan Army, and commemorates the Battle of Las Piedras which took place on that date. The medal is presented in three classes and are awarded based on the rank of the recipient. The medal is awarded to Uruguayan and foreign military officers, as well as civilians, for outstanding achievement and meritorious service.

== Appearance ==
The design of the medal depicts a four-armed cross of the sun's rays in silver. In the center of the cross is the Artigas' Cockade. The second class medal adds a golden laurel wreath around the cockade, while the first class medal includes the laurel wreath as well as three gold five-pointed start surmounting the cockade.

The ribbon of the medal is 36 mm wide, with a broad central stripe of white, flanked by blue edges, bisected by red stripes. When worn as a service ribbon, the grades of the medal are differentiated by a device. The ribbon for the third class is plain, the ribbon for the second class bears a gold colored laurel wreath device in the center, while the first class service ribbon bears a laurel wreath device surrounding three five-pointed gold stars.

== Recipients ==
- Carlos Alberto dos Santos Cruz
- Guido Manini Ríos
- Simon Stuart (general)
