= Irene Robledo =

Mexican educator and humanist

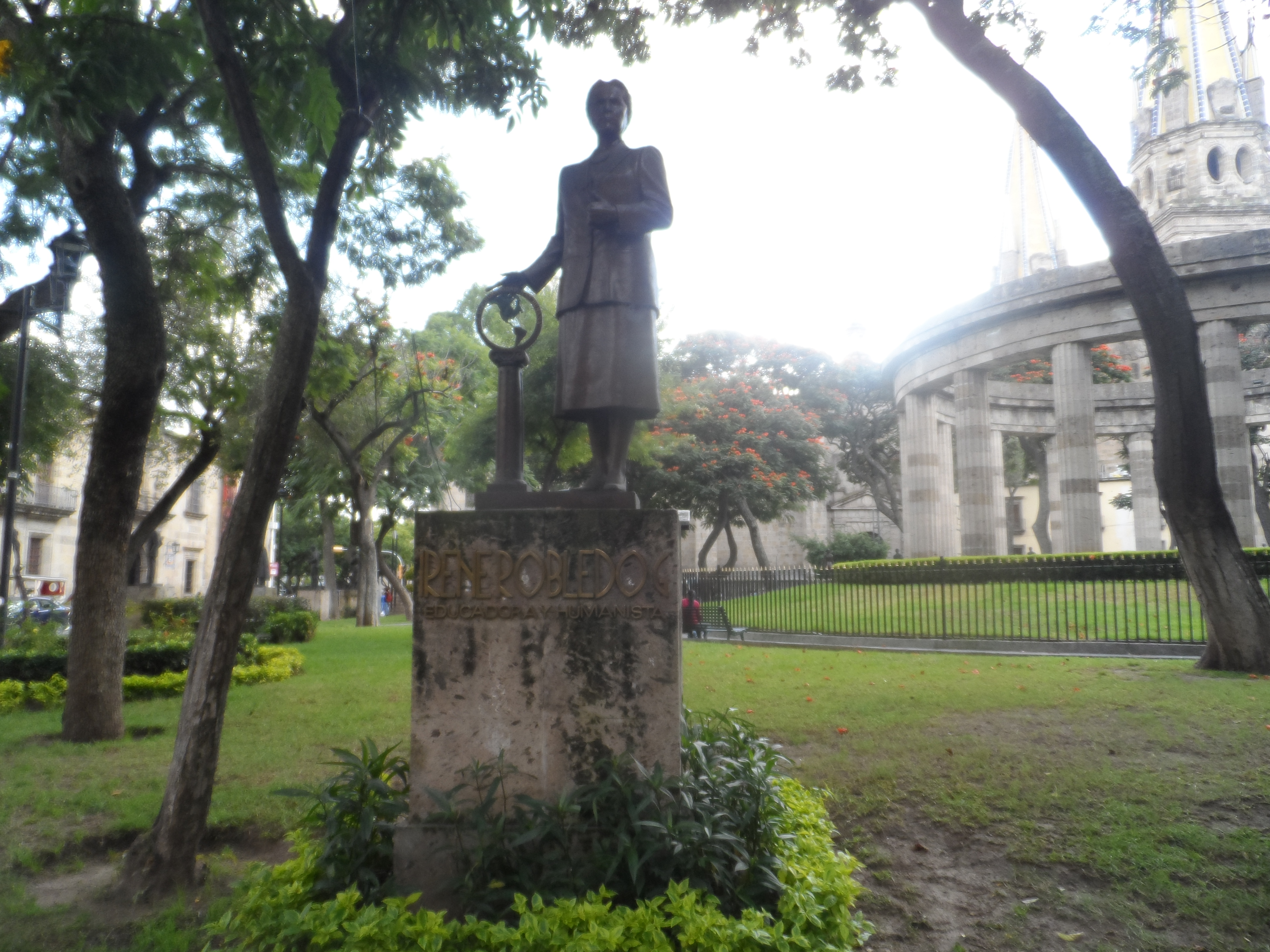
Irene Robledo García (statue)

Irene Robledo García (April 5, 1890 – August 8, 1988) was a Mexican educator and humanist from Jalisco. She was a co-founder of the modern era of the University of Guadalajara. Her personal motto was "For a more human humanity".

She broke with the feminine stereotypes of the early twentieth century by studying to be a teacher, and later as a homeopathic doctor, dentist, and social worker. She was considered a normalist teacher who overcame her class limitations and gender stereotypes by inserting herself into groups with intellectual interests. Robledo retired from teaching after working for 64 uninterrupted years in the educational field, including at the Faculty of Commerce and Administration, at the Faculty of Economics, at the Preparatory and Normal School for Young Women, at the Normal Mixed School and High School, at the Faculty of Dentistry and at the Faculty of Social Work.

She participated in the organization of the first labor unions, established night high schools, instituted school breakfasts, developed cooperatives of normal school teachers, and was the chair at the Universidad Obrera. In 1905, she entered the Normal School of Guadalajara. She actively participated with the group of intellectuals that Governor José Guadalupe Zuno met with for the re-opening of the University of Guadalajara in 1925. Robledo placed emphasis on integral education, on the participation of women in careers which had been exclusive for men, on the installation of the Institute of technology, and on providing a social culture based on freedom to make education available to everyone.

== Early life and education ==
Irene Robledo García was born in Guadalajara, April 5, 1890. She was the third of eight children (five girls, three boys) in the family of Constancio Robledo Hernández and Concepción García Morales.

After the father was appointed a judge in Tequila, Jalisco, the family removed to that city and Robledo started her studies at the elementary school. While studying in that school, she worked as an assistant teacher. She completed her studies in 1911 as a normal superior.

== Career ==
After completing her studies, Robledo's first job was as an auxiliary teacher at the "Modelo" Elementary School in Guadalajara. In 1914, she became the Director of Elementary School No. 18, while at the same time, she was a professor at the Normal School. Beginning in 1919 and for the next eleven years, she served as director of the Preparatory School for Young Women. The following year, she was in charge of the Preparatory and Normal School for Young Women. From 1921 to 1922, she was a math teacher at the Universidad Obrera de México, and in 1925, she was one of the co-founders of the University of Guadalajara in its modern era.

In 1930, she collaborated with developing the literacy of unionized workers. During this decade, she studied in the United States to be a homeopathic doctor, dentist, and social worker, as this education was not available in Mexico. After being closed twice, the university was reorganized in 1936, under the Directorate of Higher Studies. At the same time. she served as a professor in the Faculty of Economics. She founded the Public Accountant career and served as an academic at the Faculty of Accounting and Administration at the University of Guadalajara. During the same period she was a social worker and dentist in the Ministry of Health and Assistance. She also founded the children's dental service, providing services there for twenty years.

In 1948, at the Women's Christian Association meeting, she founded the first school of social work in Guadalajara, but was forced two years later to close it, as it was unable to grant official degrees. In 1950, with the support of the government, Robledo founded the Department of Social Work at the University of Guadalajara. Three years later, with the support of the rector, Jorge Matute Remus, the School of Social Work at the University of Guadalajara was founded. In October 1978, she resigned as director of the School.

== Death and legacy ==
Robledo died on August 8, 1988, in Guadalajara. Her remains were interred in the Panteón de Mezquitán for more than a decade. On October 10, 2000, they were transferred to the Rotonda de los Jaliscienses Ilustres. She is the first woman whose remains rest there. The Congress of the State of Jaliscienses gave her the title, “Benemérita en grado Heroico”.

The University of Guadalajara, honoring the work of Robledo, grants a prize Presire to the Social Service "Irene Robledo García" for social service providers, academics, administrative workers, officials and university figures, as well as civil associations or institutions that have stood out with their participation, trajectory or contributions to social service.

== Awards and honors ==
- 1955, Founding president of the modern era University of Guadalajara
- 1972, Named "Novia eterna de la Universidad de Guadalajara" by the rector of the University of Guadalajara, José Parres Arias when she received the honorary doctorate title, Doctor Honoris causa, in 1972 from the president of Mexico, Luis Echeverría. She was the only woman with this award until 1993, when it was granted to Rigoberta Menchú.
- 1975, President of the International Year of Women
- 1979, Distinguished member of the Tapatian community, H. Ayto. of Guadalajara
- 1982, President of the Jalisco Medical Association
