= Apodaca–Canning treaty =

1809 treaty between the United Kingdom and Spain

The Apodaca–Canning treaty (formally the Treaty of Peace, Friendship, and Alliance, between his Britannic majesty and his Catholic majesty, Ferdinand the 7th) was a treaty between the United Kingdom of Great Britain and Ireland and Spain signed by Juan Ruiz de Apodaca and George Canning on 14 January 1809.

The popular uprising of 2 May led the Junta of Seville to seek help from Britain in their resistance to France. In this treaty, Britain was given trade facilitation in the Spanish domains, in exchange for military supplies to support the armies and guerrilla troops of Spain.
