= Order of Military Merit of the Companions of Artigas =

Military Order of Merit of the Companions of Artigas Orden Militar al Mérito Tenientes de Artigas
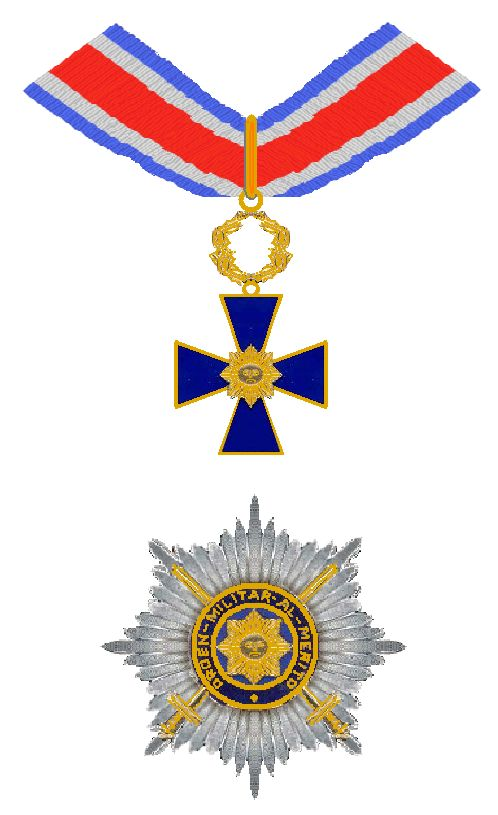
- Insignia of a Grand Officer
- Type: Five-class military decoration awarded with and without swords
- Country: Uruguay
- Status: Discontinued 1985
- Established: 1979
- Ribbon of the order
- Related: Medal of Military Merit

The Military Order of Merit of the Companions of Artigas (Spanish: El Orden Militar al Mérito Tenientes de Artigas), was a military decoration of Uruguay.

== History ==
The Military Order of Merit of the Companions of Artigas was established by Law N° 14.955 on 13 November 1979. It was created by the ruling civilian-military administration, which governed Uruguay between 1973 and 1985. The name "tenientes de Artigas" or "Companions of Artigas" honours the 19th-century freedom-fighter José Gervasio Artigas. The statutes governing the order were further modified in 1980, and ultimately repealed on 6 March 1985.

In 1991, the government of Uruguay established the Medal of Military Merit as the highest military decoration of the Army of Uruguay. It uses the same ribbon as the Military Order of Merit of the Companions of Artigas.

== Classes ==
The order was awarded in five different classes:

- Grand Cross
- Grand Officer
- Commander
- Officer
- Knight
