= Medal of Military Merit (Uruguay) =

Medal of Military Merit Medalla al Mérito Militar
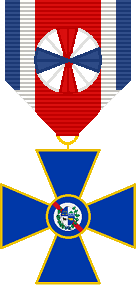
- Medal of Military Merit for officers and commanders (Third class)
- Type: Three class military decoration awarded with and without swords
- Country: Uruguay
- Presented by: President of Uruguay
- Status: Currently awarded
- Established: 1991
- Ribbon of the medal, first class

Precedence
- Next (lower): 18 May 1811 Medal

The Medal of Military Merit (Spanish: Medalla al Mérito Militar), is a military decoration of Uruguay. The decoration is awarded by the President of Uruguay. This award replaces the Order of Military Merit of the Companions of Artigas which was discontinued in 1985.

== Background ==
The Medal of Military Merit was established on 28 November 1991 by Ministry of National Defense Decree N° 199/991. The regulations of the medal were further modified on 29 January 1992 by Decree N° 511/991. The Medal of Military merit is the highest military decoration of the Army of Uruguay.

== Classes ==
The medal is awarded with or without swords in three different classes:

- First class is awarded to General officers and their civilian equivalents
- Second class is awarded to senior officers and their civilian equivalents
- Third class is awarded to officers and commanders and their civilian equivalents
