= Order of the Oriental Republic of Uruguay =

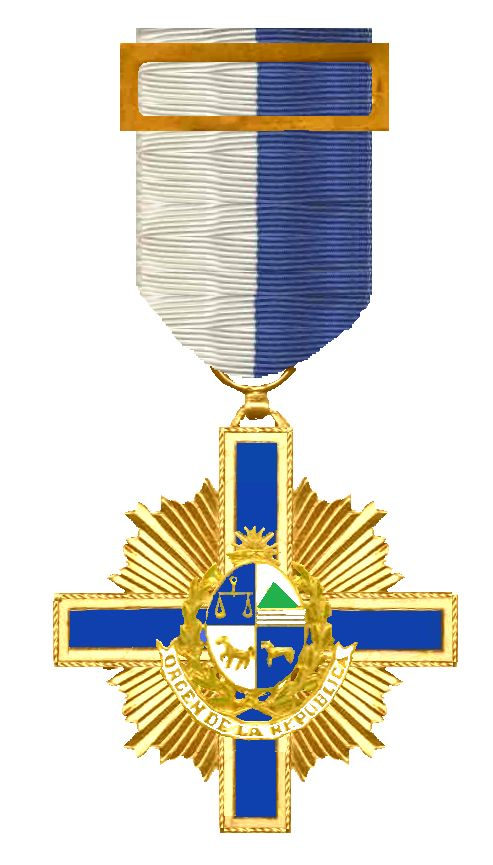
- Type: State Order
- Country: Uruguay
- Presented by: the President of Uruguay
- Status: Suppressed in 1985
- Ribbon of the order
- Related: Medal of the Oriental Republic of Uruguay

The Order of the Oriental Republic of Uruguay was a decoration created by the 1973-1985 civic-military dictatorship to award to foreign personalities for extraordinary meritorious acts rendered to the country or for reciprocity purposes. It was eliminated after the repeal of the rule that created it by Law No. 15738. In 1992 the Medal of the Oriental Republic of Uruguay was created.

== Institution of order ==
The order was instituted in the year 1984 by the civilian-military administration that ruled the Republic of Uruguay. After the transition from the civilian-military administration in 1985, the order was suppressed.

== Ranks ==
This order consisted of the following grades or ranks:

- Collar
- Grand Cross
- Sash (only for women)
- Commander
- Officer
- Knight

== Features ==
=== Cross description ===
The blue and white cross has an enamelled Uruguayan coat of arms in the centre. The cross is topped by a Sun of May in silver or gold.

== See also ==
- Sun of May § Historical reference
