= Pedro Moreno (soldier) =

Mexican insurgent

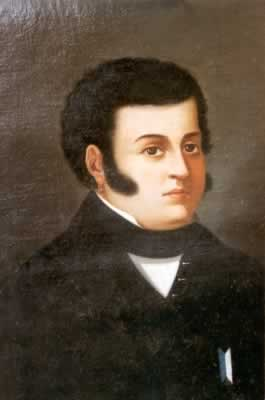
- Born: Pedro Moreno González de Hormosillo; January 18, 1775; Hacienda de La Daga, Province of Santiago, New Spain (now Lagos de Moreno, Jalisco, Mexico)
- Died: October 27, 1817 (aged 42); Intendancy of Guanajuato, New Spain

Pedro Moreno Gonzalez (January 18, 1775 – October 27, 1817) was an insurgent in the Mexican War of Independence.

== Early days ==
Moreno was born in Hacienda de La Daga, a community in the Mexican city of Villa de Santa María de los Lagos (later renamed Lagos de Moreno in his honor), the son of Manuel Moreno de Ortega y Verdín de Villavicencio and María del Rosario González de Hermosillo y Márquez. He studied in the Guadalajara seminary.

At the end of the 18th century, he went back to his home town and became a trader. He married Rita Pérez Jiménez.

== Start of the fight ==
At his hacienda La Sauceda, he organized the farmers to fight against the Spaniards. His headquarters was Fuerte del Sombrero, where Francisco Javier Mina joined Pedro Moreno's forces. In this fort, they fought until August 15, 1817, when they had to evacuate the fort because of a Spanish attack.

Once out of the fort, the locations of all their battles were: El Bajío and Los Altos de Jalisco. Pedro Moreno and Francisco Javier Mina went back to the Fuerte del Sombrero.

== Final days ==
The Spaniards again attacked the fort but this time continuously for two months. Without food, provisions, and any hope of help, the revolutionaries had to evacuate the fort.

On October 27, while traveling on their escape, they had to stop at the ranch El Venadito in Guanajuato, where they were attacked. In this attack Pedro Moreno was killed.

== See also ==
- Statue of Pedro Moreno
