= Acquarone =

Acquarone (Italian pronunciation: [akkwaˈroːne]) is an Italian surname. Notable people with the surname include:

- Lorenzo Acquarone (1931–2020), Italian politician
- Luciano Acquarone (1930–2024), Italian athlete
- Orestes Acquarone (1875–1952), Uruguayan artist
- Pietro Acquarone (1917–1993), Italian footballer
- Romeo Acquarone (1895–1980), French tennis player

== See also ==
- Aquarone
- Pietro d'Acquarone (1890–1948), Italian soldier, entrepreneur and politician
