= Orestes Acquarone =

Uruguayan lithographist and painter (1875–1952)

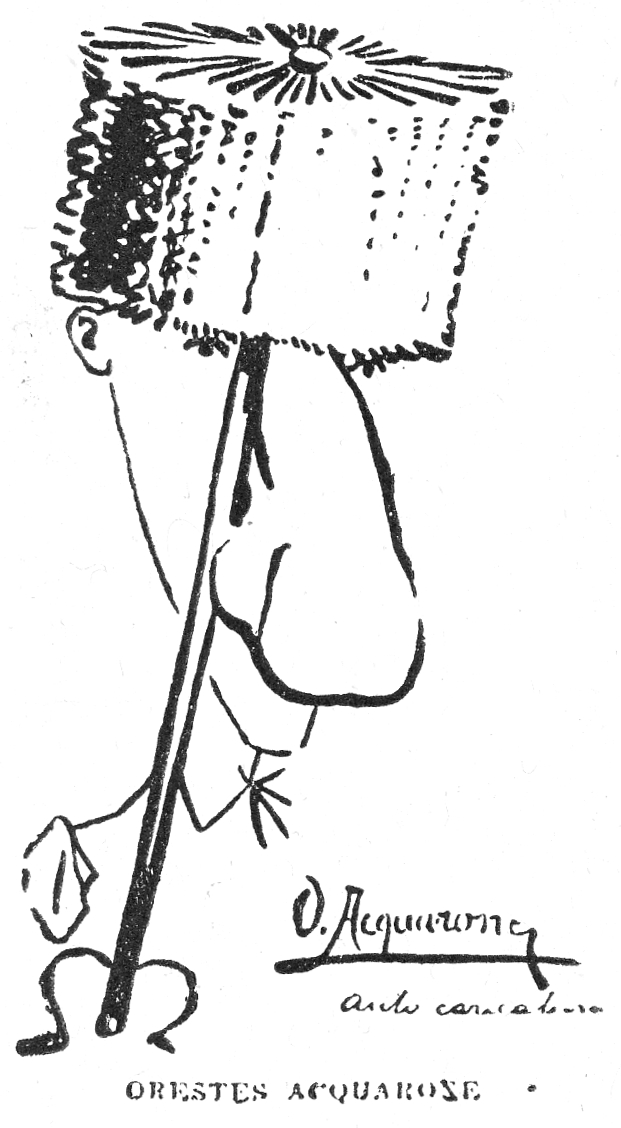
- Self-caricature in 1900.
- Born: Orestes Acquarone Salaberry; 27 April 1875; Uruguay, Montevideo
- Died: 9 November 1952 (aged 77); Uruguay, Montevideo
- Occupations: lithographist, painter, cartoonist, watercolourist, sculptor, poet

Signature
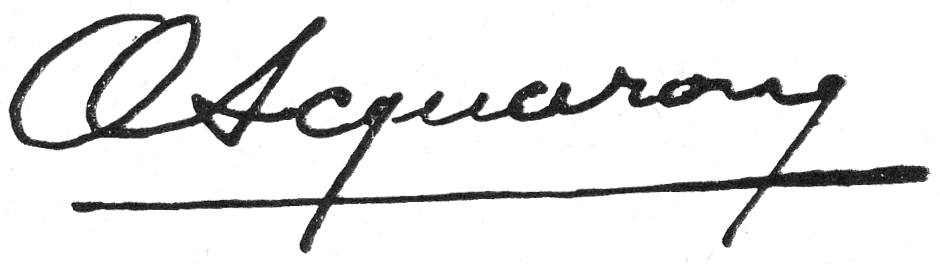

Orestes Acquarone Salaberry (27 April 1875 - 9 November 1952) was a Uruguayan lithographist, painter, cartoonist, watercolourist, sculptor and poet. Between 1909 and 1914 he was in charge of La Semana magazine.

== Biography ==
Acquarone began his studies as an apprentice to a professional audio recorder in 1897 in the lithograph “Sud America,” where he received his first lessons on drawing from Diógenes Hequet. He attended night classes with professor Goffredo Sommavilla in Italian schools for three years. In 1898 Acqurone was responsible for an art of a political, satirical, and literary magazine. The magazine, known as “El Negro Timoteo,” was directed by Washington Bermúdez. In 1899, Acquarone was an artist under the supervision of Eduardo Sojo for the Buenos Aires magazine Don Quijote, under the direction of Eduardo Sojo. The following year, Acquarone was an illustrator for the magazine Montevidean called, “Rojo y Blanco.”

In 1903, he entered the Círculo Fomento de Bellas Artes as a founding member and as a disciple of the painter Carlos María Herrera. There, he was given the honor to be declared in charge of the decorative drawing classes Between 1909 and 1914, Acquarone was the director of the magazine “La Semana.” Shortly after, he traveled to Buenos Aires where he resided for a period of 7 years and collaborated with important publications. In 1921, Acquarone moved to Rio de Janeiro where he again worked as a collaborator of relevant newspapers and magazines. His paintings and sculptures were featured in national halls of art. Between 1928 and 1930, Acquarone lived in New York where he collaborated with a Hungarian artist, Willy Pogany, in the creation of the various painted murals.

After Acquarone's death, a book called, “Homenaje a Orestes Acquarone” was edited. The book included text from Walter Ernesto Laroche in 1951, poetry and other works from Acquarone, and obituaries that were printed after his death.
