= Ernest Morales III =

American law enforcement officer

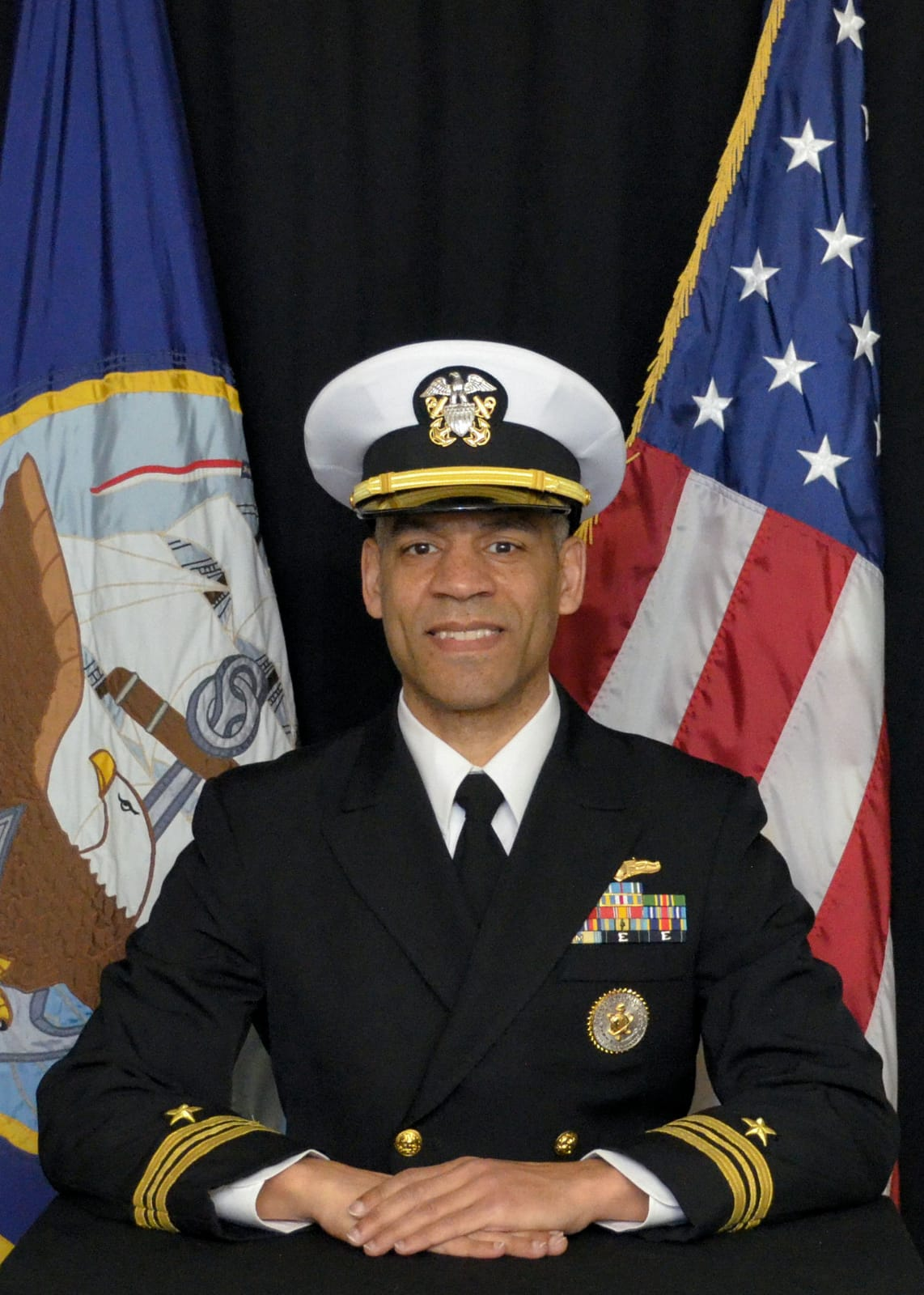

9th Chief of the Metro Transit Police Department
- In office February 27, 2023 – September 23, 2024
- Preceded by: Eddie Frizell
- Succeeded by: Joseph Dotseth

Mount Vernon Police Department First Deputy Commissioner
- In office July 21, 2020 – December 31, 2022

Personal details
- Born: August 2, 1967 (age 59)
- Education: John Jay College of Criminal Justice

Military service
- Branch/service: United States Navy; United States Navy Reserve
- Years of service: 1999-2021
- Highest rank attained: Lt. Commander
- Awards: Defense Meritorious Service Medal; Joint Service Achievement Medal; Meritorious Service Medal; Navy and Marine Corps Achievement Medal

Ernest Morales III (born August 2, 1967) is an American former law enforcement officer who served as chief of the Metro Transit Police Department in Minnesota from 2023 to 2024. He previously served in the New York City Police Department and as first deputy police commissioner of the Mount Vernon Police Department in New York.

== Early life and education ==
Ernest Morales III was born and raised on the Lower East Side of Manhattan.

Morales attended Chelsea Career & Technical Education High School. He credits boxing as his means of escaping the difficult circumstances of growing up in New York City during the 1970s and 1980s, with his first experience in the boxing ring at age 11.

Morales attended Empire State University. He earned a Bachelor of Science degree in Police Administration and later went on to complete a Master's degree in Protection Management from John Jay College.

== Military service ==
Morales served in the United States Navy Reserve. He was selected for promotion to the permanent rank of lieutenant commander in 2018.

== Career ==
=== New York City Police Department ===
Morales served for 30 years in the New York City Police Department, where he attained the rank of deputy inspector and served as a commanding officer in the Transit Bureau.

Morales has received the Six Star Medal for completing all six of the world's major marathons. He was the first NYPD member to receive the medal.

=== Mount Vernon Police Department ===
In July 2020, Morales became first deputy police commissioner of the Mount Vernon Police Department in New York. He was the first Latino to hold the position.

=== Metro Transit Police Department ===
Morales began serving as the police chief for the Metro Transit Police Department (MTPD) in Minneapolis, Minnesota, on February 27, 2023.

In June 2023, Morales signed the 30×30 Initiative, which seeks to increase the representation of women in policing.

==== Investigation and resignation ====
In August 2024, Morales was placed on paid leave as chief of the Metro Transit Police Department following complaints from several female employees alleging sexual harassment and discriminatory conduct. An outside law firm hired by the department subsequently concluded that Morales had committed multiple instances of workplace misconduct. Morales resigned in September 2024 before being interviewed as part of the investigation and denied the allegations, attributing them to retaliation related to his leadership style. In 2026, the Minnesota Board of Peace Officer Standards and Training found reasonable grounds to believe that Morales had engaged in sexual harassment and failed to report it to the board. Morales agreed to surrender his Minnesota peace officer license to avoid a contested case hearing and was barred from renewing or obtaining another Minnesota peace officer license.
