= Portuguese invasion of the Banda Oriental =

Portuguese invasion of the Banda Oriental may refer to:

- Portuguese invasion of the Banda Oriental (1811–12), the first (unsuccessful) attempt
- Portuguese invasion of the Banda Oriental (1816), the second and last invasion
