= Blandengues de Artigas =

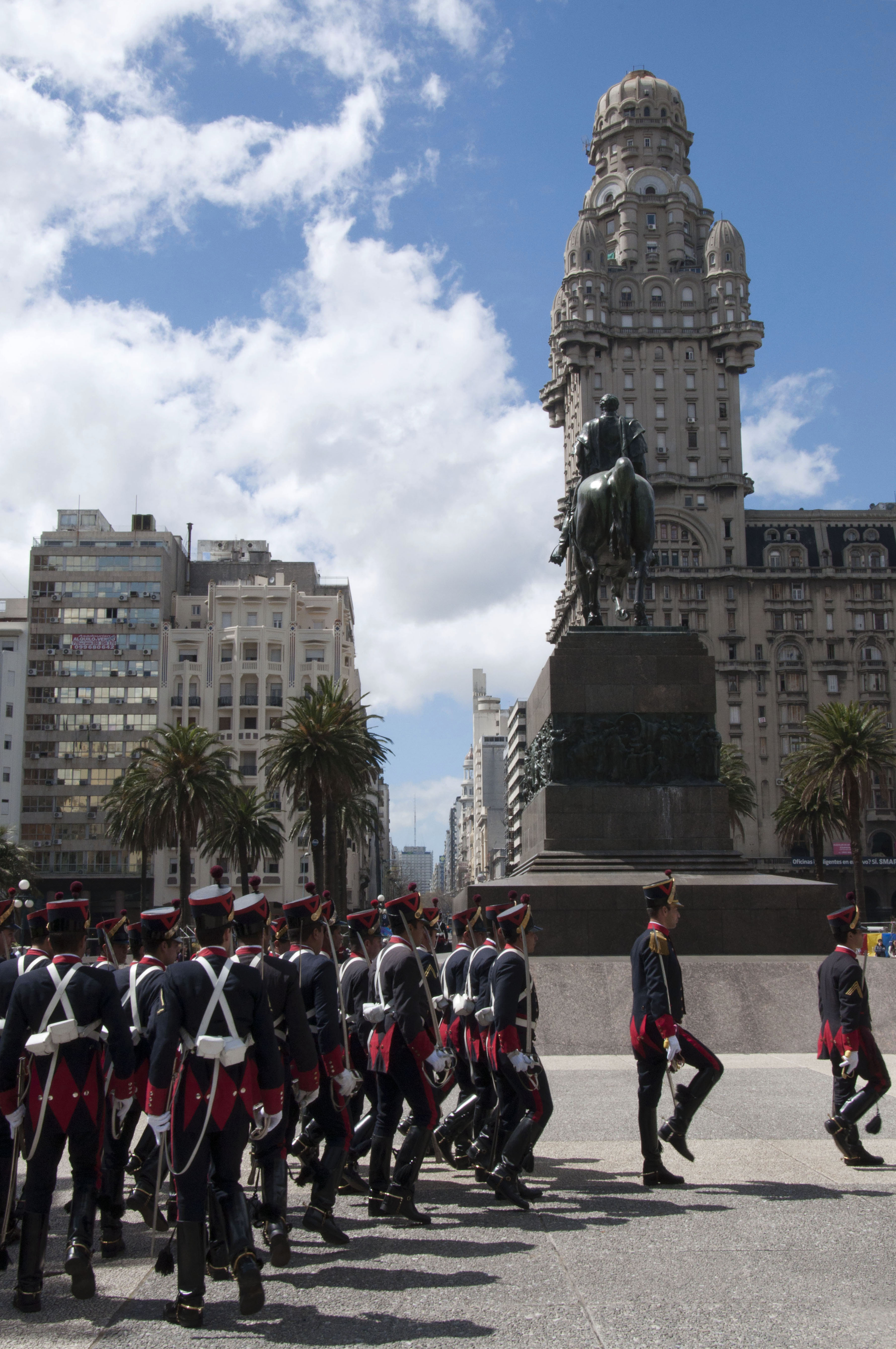
Changing of the guard, September 2013.

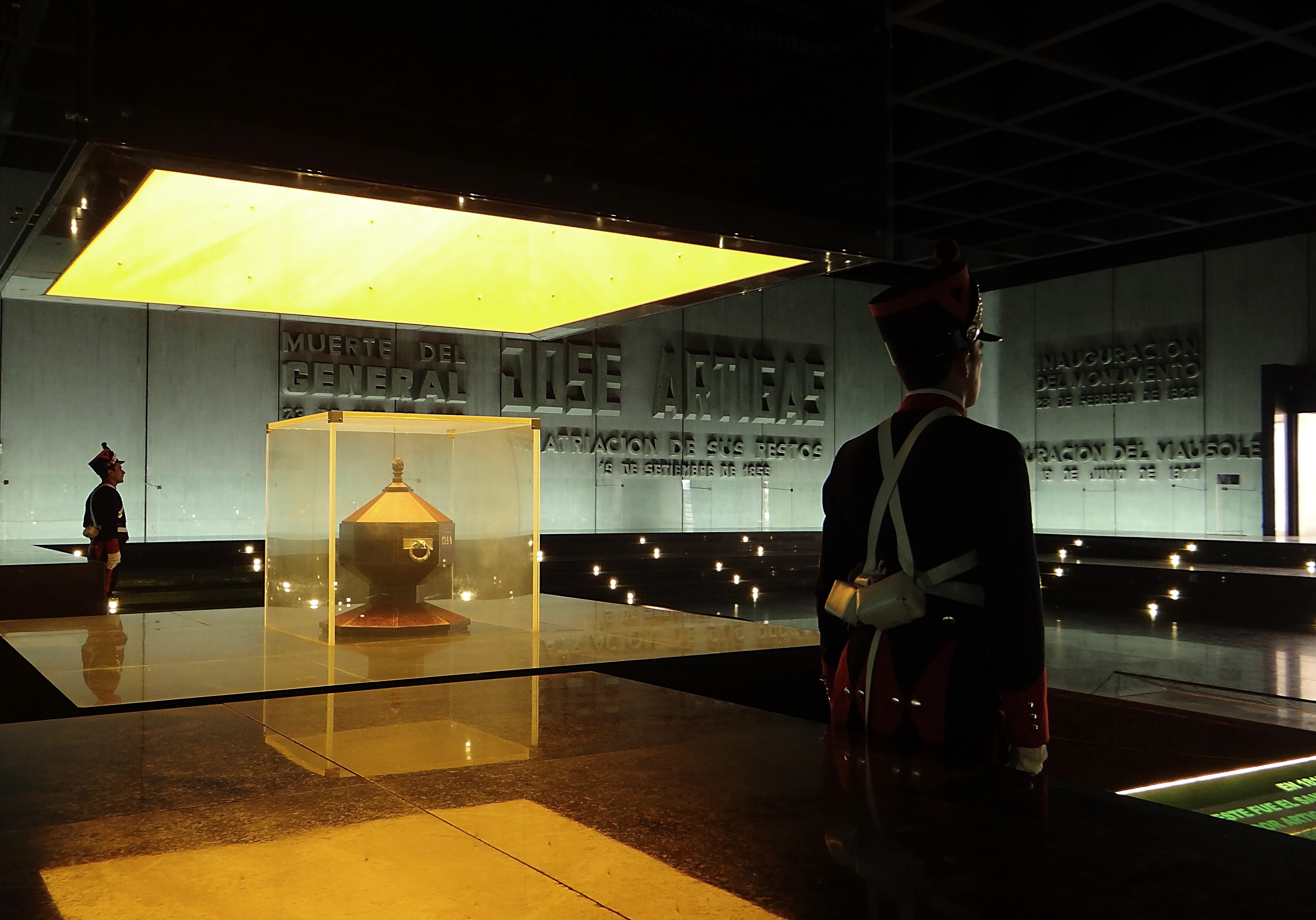
Two Blandengues stand guard beside Artigas's remains, September 2013.

The Regimiento de Blandengues de Artigas is a military service dedicated to the protocolary protection of the Head of State of Uruguay.

Formerly known as Blandengues de Montevideo (to distinguish them from the Blandengues de Buenos Aires) they were created by royal decree of Charles IV. Nowadays they are named after José Gervasio Artigas, the foremost historical figure in Uruguay, who had joined it and fought against the Spanish colonial authorities. Their headquarters is located at 3920 General Flores Avenue in Montevideo. This building was inaugurated on August 25, 1910, the same day the unit was officially given its current name and mission.

In Montevideo, at Independence Square, Artigas Mausoleum is guarded by two Blandengues.
