= Aquarone =

Aquarone is a surname. Notable people with the surname include:

- Paulo Aquarone (born 1956), Brazilian multimedia poet
- Steffan Aquarone (born 1984), British politician

== See also ==
- Acquarone
