= Battle of Las Piedras (1811) =

Battle in the Uruguayan struggle for independence

- Part of the Spanish American wars of independence
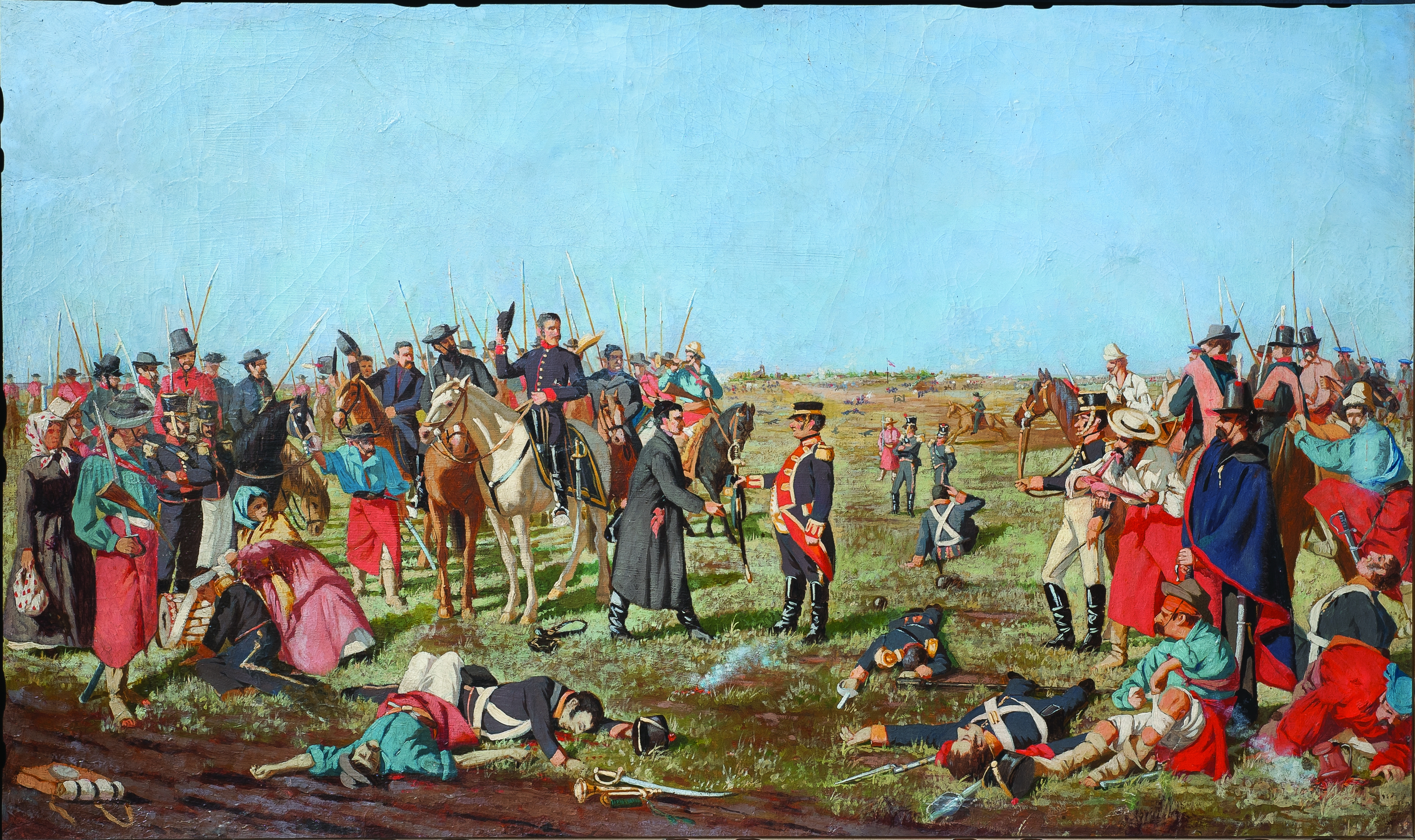
- Surrender of Posadas at Las Piedras, by Juan Manuel Blanes
Date	May 18, 1811
Location	Near Las Piedras, Uruguay
Result	Revolutionary victory

Belligerents
Spain: Royalist Army of Montevideo	Revolutionaries of the United Provinces of the Rio de la Plata

Commanders and leaders
(Spain) José Posadas (POW)	José Gervasio Artigas; Manuel Francisco Artigas

Strength
Official Report: 668 600 cavalrymen 350 infantrymen 64 gunners with 4 pieces 2 4 inch cannons 2 64 mm mortars Acevedo's Estimation: ~1,004 ~500 infantrymen ~450 cavalrymen ~54 gunners with 4 pieces	Official Report: 1,076 600 cavalrymen (250 mounted regiment and 296 gauchos in two squadrons) 454 infantrymen (108 militia, 250 from the Patricios' Regiment and 96 Blandengues) 20 gunners 2 cannons Acevedo's Estimation: ~1,770 ~1,300 cavalrymen ~430 infantrymen ~40 gunners with 4 pieces

Casualties and losses
638 97 killed 61 wounded 480 prisoners	Negligible

The Battle of Las Piedras was fought on May 18, 1811 as part of the Rio de la Plata war of independence. It was a resounding victory for the revolutionary forces, led by José Gervasio Artigas.

== Background and development of events ==
In 1810, the May Revolution forced the Spanish to abandon Buenos Aires, but they held on to the Banda Oriental (present-day Uruguay), as Spain moved the headquarters of the Viceroyalty of the Río de la Plata to Montevideo. At the beginning of April 1811, the revolutionary José Gervasio Artigas returned to the Banda Oriental with approximately 180 men provided by the Government of Buenos Aires. On April 11, he issued the Mercedes Proclamation, assuming control of the revolution.

The Governor of Montevideo, Francisco Javier de Elío, appointed frigate-captain José Posadas as the head of the forces loyal to Spain. Posadas installed his headquarters at San Isidro Labrador de Las Piedras near Montevideo, to provoke a decisive battle against the revolutionaries.

Meanwhile, José Artigas was camped near Nuestra Señora de Guadalupe with an army of a thousand men. The army of Posadas counted 1230 men, of which some 200 would defect to Artigas in the midst of battle.

The battle happened on May 18 at Las Piedras, and resulted in a total victory for the revolutionaries. José Posadas capitulated. It was at this occasion that Artigas pronounced his famous sentence "Clemencia para los vencidos, curad a los heridos, respetad a los prisioneros" (Mercy to the vanquished, cure the injured, respect the prisoners), an unusual decision in those times, referring to the Spanish wounded and prisoners. One of the casualties on the revolutionary side was Manuel Artigas, nephew of José Artigas.

Both armies fought in the name of King Ferdinand VII of Spain.

Artigas' forces numbered around 1,100 men and Posadas commanded around 1,200. Artigas lost around 70 men killed, while Posadas lost around 100 killed, 60 wounded, and 500 captured.

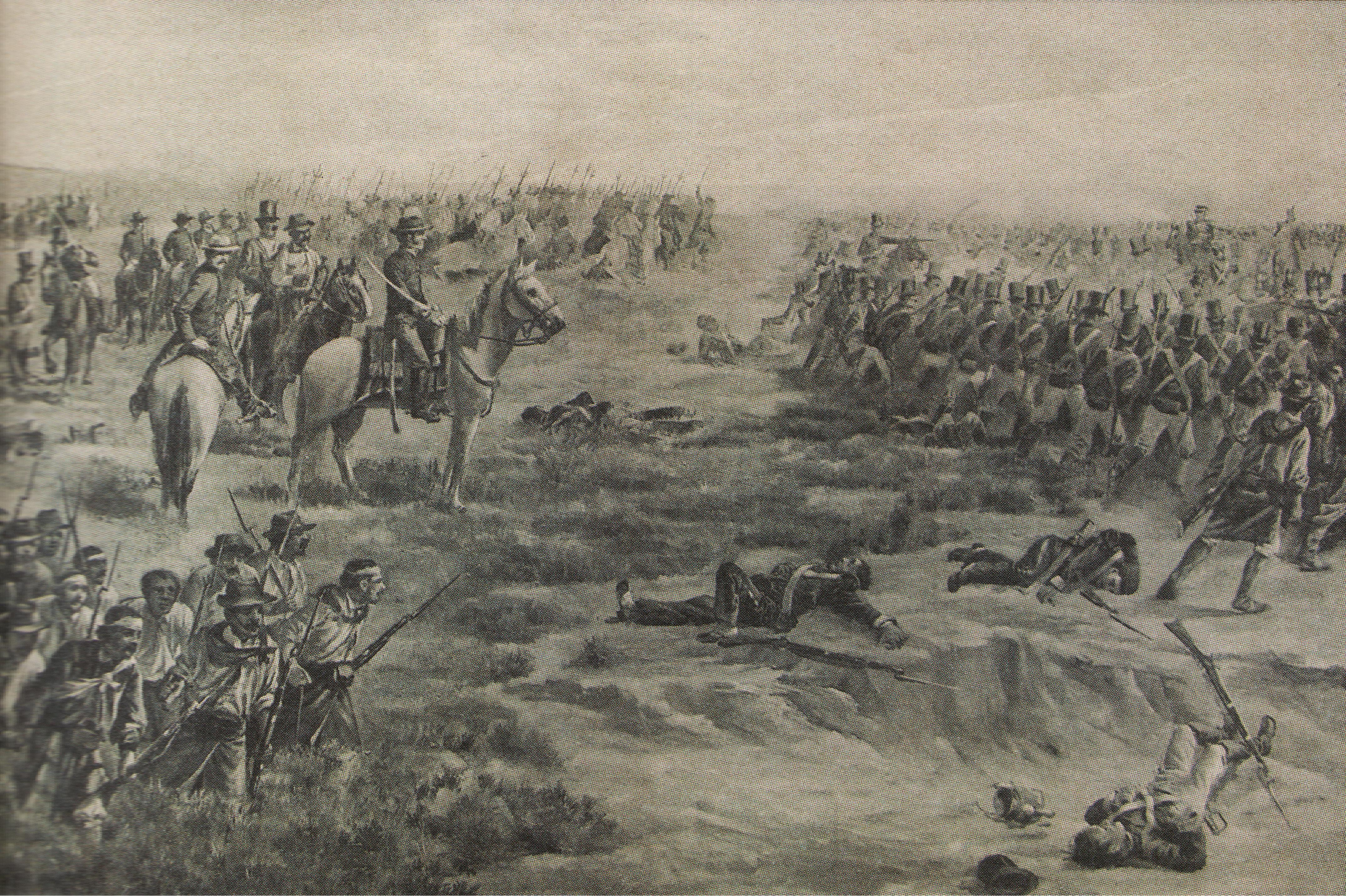
The Battle of Las Piedras by Diógenes Hequet

== Importance of the battle ==
Some historians consider the victory in the Battle of Las Piedras as crucial for the survival of the revolution in Uruguay and Argentina, after the defeats of General Manuel Belgrano in Paraguay and Paraná.

After the battle, the Royalists remained in control of only Colonia del Sacramento and Montevideo, which was finally taken by Carlos María de Alvear on June 20, 1814.

The day of the battle, May 18, is now an official holiday in Uruguay. The date is also commemorated in the military and civilian honour, the 18 May 1811 Medal.

== See also ==
- First Siege of Montevideo
