= Spring Street Park =

Public park in Manhattan, New York

Coordinates: 40.7249°N 74.0045°W

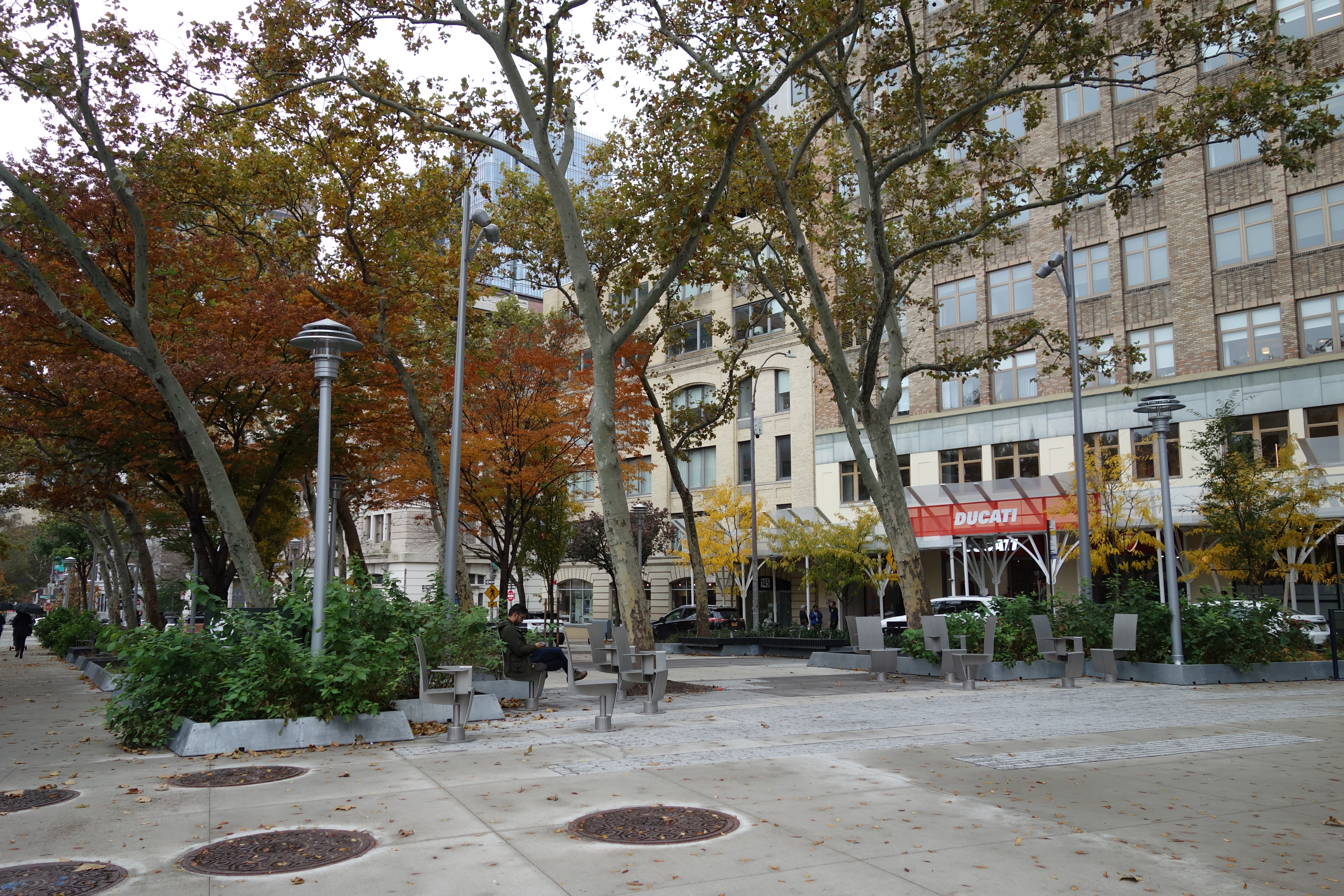
Looking south from Spring Street.

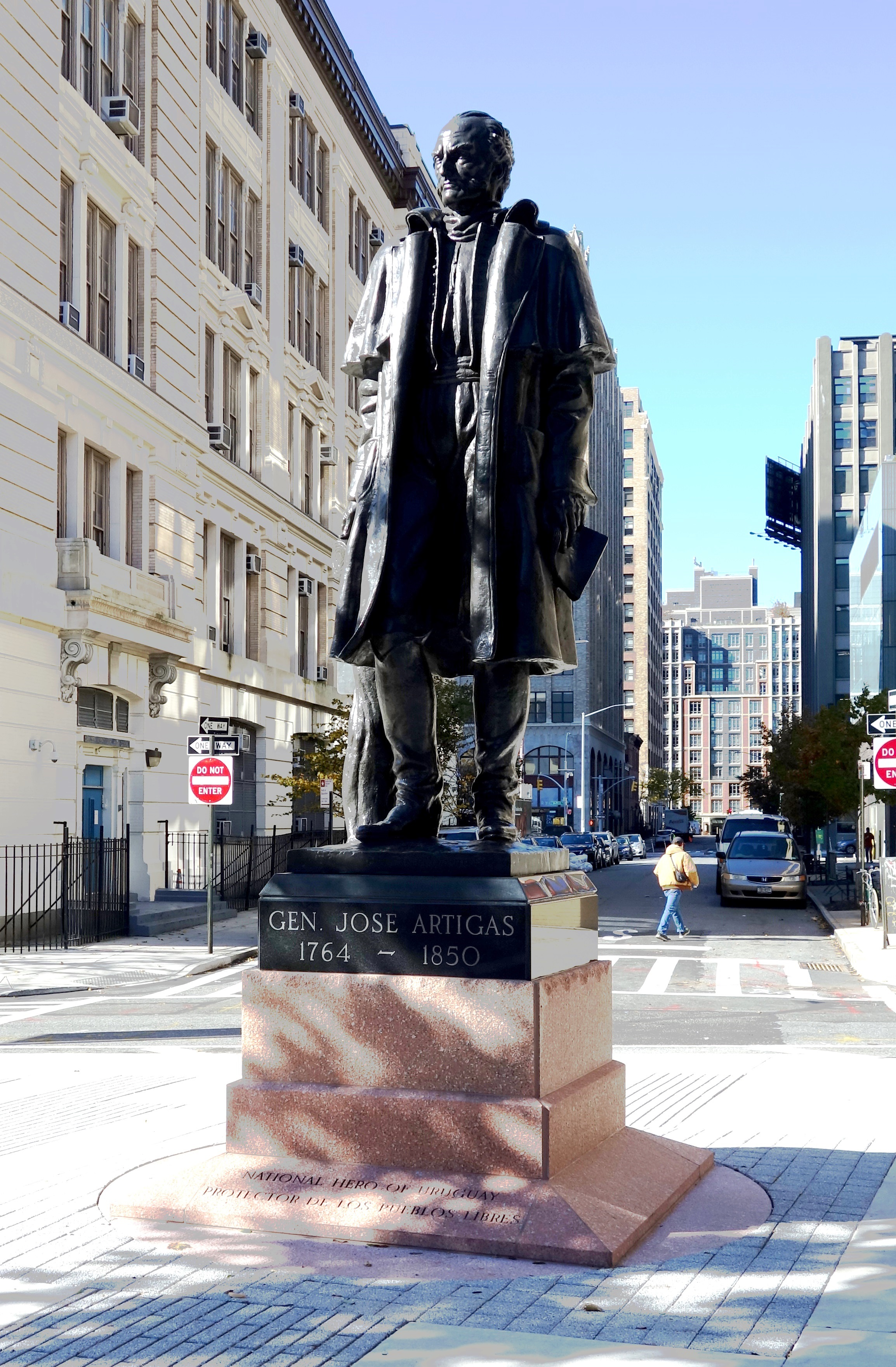
The statue of José Gervasio Artigas at Dominick Street.

Spring Street Park is a small triangular park in the lower Manhattan neighborhood of Hudson Square in New York City. The park is bounded by Spring Street on the north, Broome Street on the south, Avenue of the Americas (Sixth Avenue) on the east, and on the west by a narrow two-block street considered to be a spur of Sixth Avenue. As a pedestrian plaza, the triangle was previously known as SoHo Square.

SoHo Square was created when Sixth Avenue was extended south of Carmine Street, one of several similar squares to come into existence in that way. In keeping with the renaming of the avenue as the "Avenue of the Americas" in 1945, it contains a larger-than-lifesize statue of General José Artigas, a Uruguayan independence leader and national hero. The statue is a second cast from a statue by Uruguayan sculptor José Luis Zorrilla de San Martín, the first of which stands in front of the Uruguayan National Bank in Montevideo, where it has been since 1949.

The land is owned by the New York City Department of Transportation and is maintained by the Hudson Square Business Improvement District (BID) and the New York City Department of Parks and Recreation. Starting in April 2017, the park was redeveloped by the Hudson Square BID. The redesign and renovation was funded by $3 million from the BID, $2 million from the New York City Economic Development Corporation and $1 million from the New York City Council. The redevelopment provided 160 places to sit, including "swivel seats", customized energy-efficient lighting, and a total of 42 trees plus other plantings. In addition, the statue of General Artigas was moved to a more central location within the park. The aim of the redesign was to create "a world-class green space that residents, employees and visitors will enjoy for generations," according to City Council member Corey Johnson. The redesign of the plaza into a park is the centerpieces of the BID's streetscape improvement plan for the Hudson Square neighborhood. The park was partially reopened in August 2018 and fully reopened two months later.

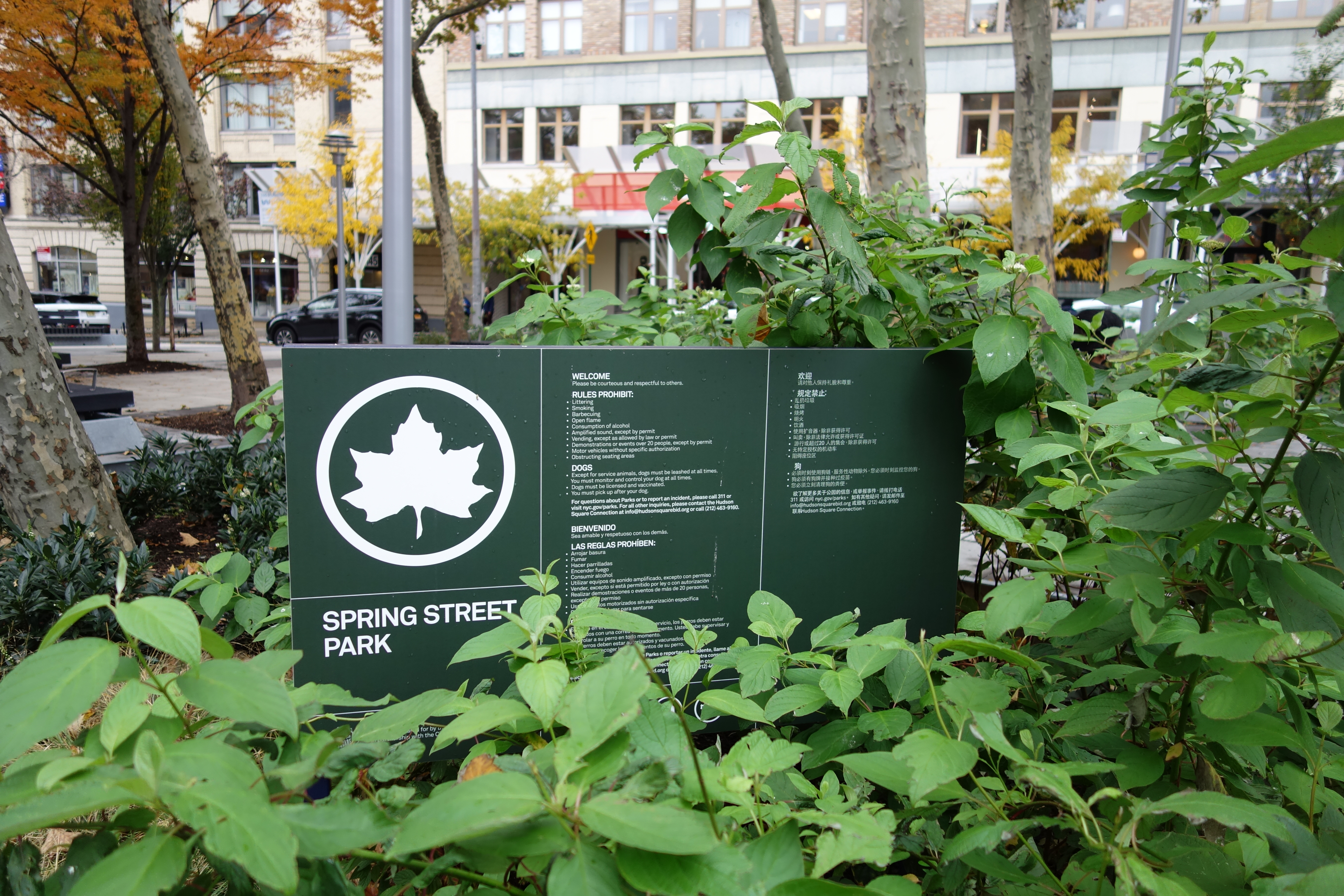
Signage at the northern entrance of the park.

The Dahesh Museum of Art, the Chelsea Career & Technical Education High School, the NYC iSchool, and the HERE Arts Center are all located around the park.
