= Artigas Mausoleum =

Mausoleum in Montevideo, Uruguay

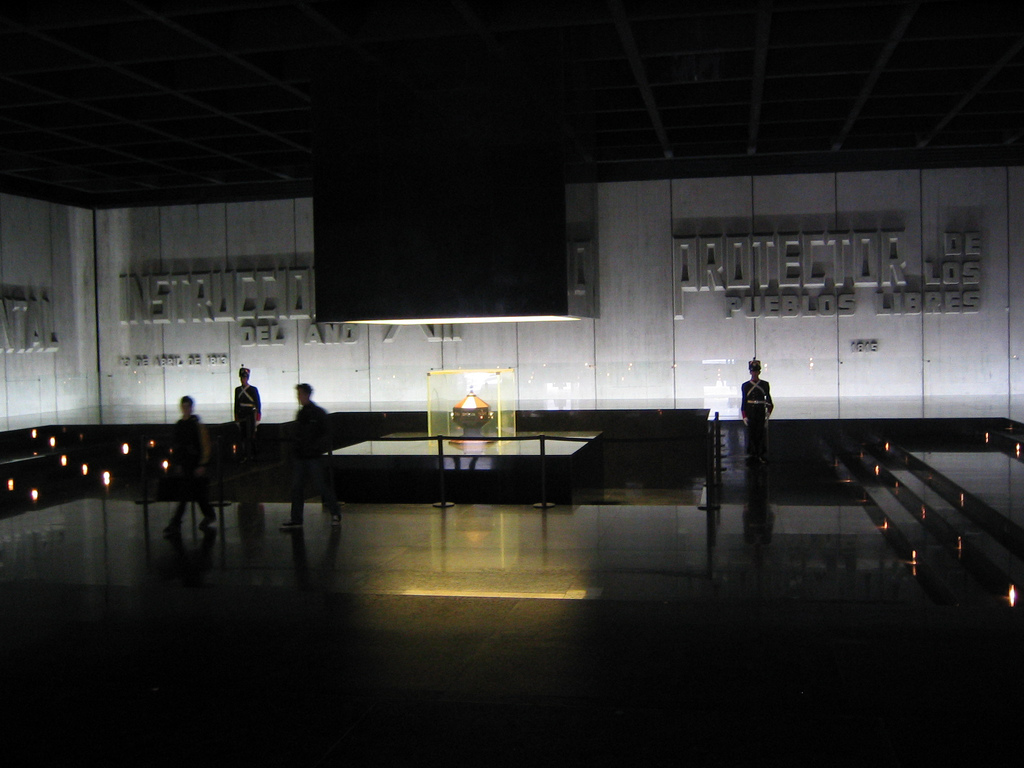
- Interactive map of Artigas Mausoleum
- Location: Montevideo, Uruguay
- Coordinates: 34°54′24″S 56°12′0″W
- Type: Mausoleum
- Material: Concrete, travertine and marble
- Dedicated to: José Artigas

The Artigas Mausoleum is a monument to Uruguayan hero José Artigas, located in Plaza Independencia, in the neighbourhood of Ciudad Vieja, Montevideo. It opened in 1977. Artigas's remains are kept in an underground room underneath the statue. The monument is guarded by two traditional guards called "Blandengues de Artigas".
