= Goffredo Sommavilla =

Italian painter (1850–1944)

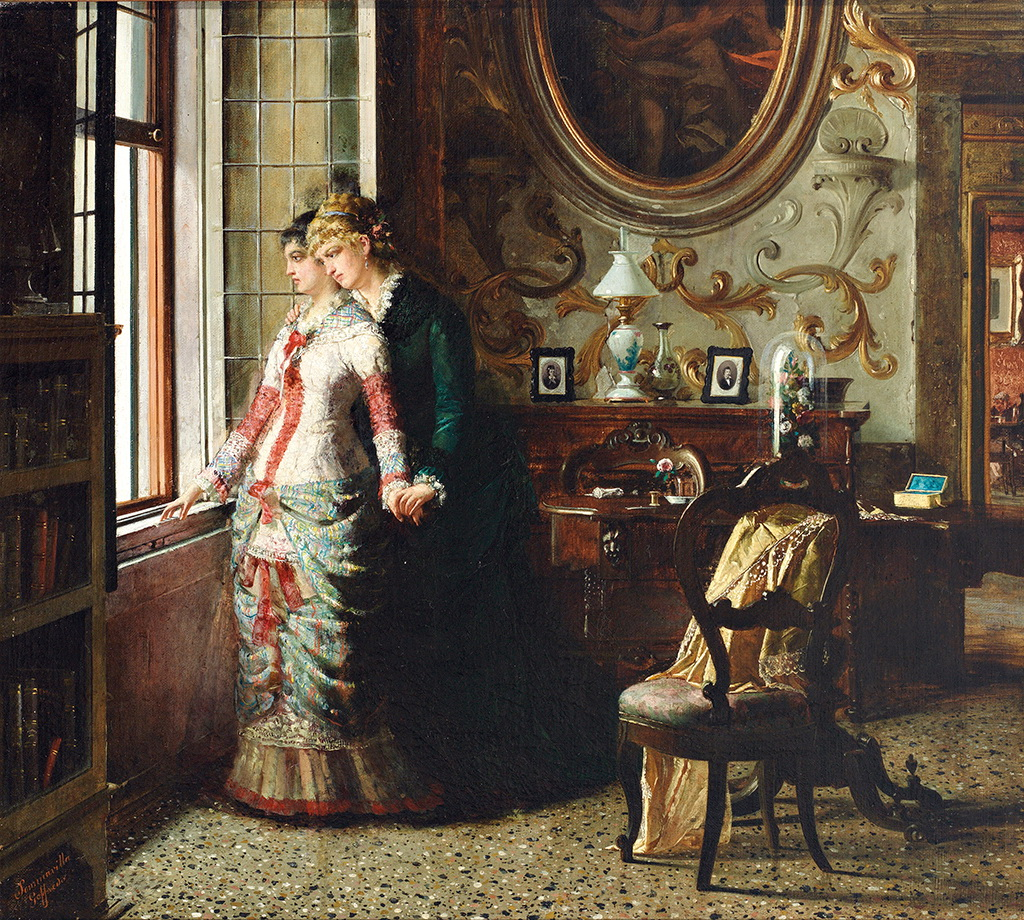
- Longing
- Born: Goffredo Sommavilla; 21 July 1850; Belluno, Austrian Empire
- Died: 21 October 1944, (aged 94); Montevideo, Uruguay
- Known for: Painting

Goffredo Sommavilla (21 July 1850 – 21 October 1944) was an Italian painter, mainly of genre themes.

He was born in Belluno. His artistic training was at the Accademia di Belle Arti in Venice. He often painted intimate family scenes, including: Le gramolatrici di canapa at the 1881 Fine Art Exposition, Milan; Flowers of Autumn at the 1881 Exposition of Fine Arts, Milan; La merenda and Le Lavandaie at the 1881, Exposition of Fine Arts, Milan; La predica della suocera and The Beverage Hour at the 1887, Exposition of Fine Arts, Milan; Il venditore di giornali and Casa nel monti della Carinò at the 1890 Mostra of Turin. He moved in 1882 to Montevideo, Uruguay, where he remained until his death. He became a professor of painting in Montevideo, and among his contemporaries were Juan Manuel Blanes, Soneira, Diógenes Hequet, and Manuel Larravide.
