= Chelsea Career & Technical Education High School =

Public school in New York City

Chelsea Career and Technical Education High School
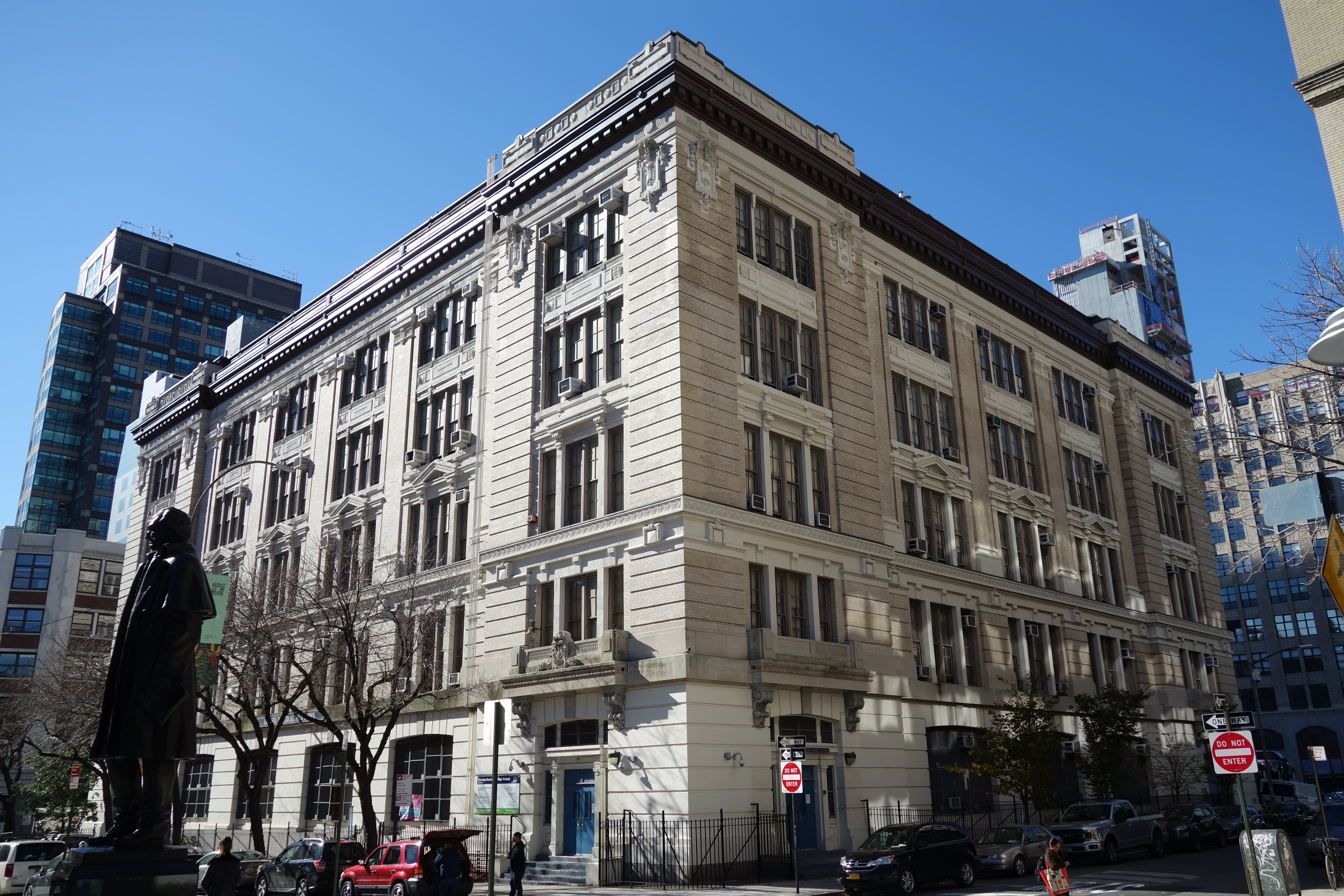
- Looking southwest from Spring Street Park

Location
- 131 Avenue of the Americas; Region 2 New York City, New York 10013; United States; 40°43′29″N 74°00′18″W

Information
- Type: Public high school, Career & Technical Education School
- Established: 1938
- Status: Open
- School district: 02
- Superintendent: Marisol Bradbury
- Principal: Jaivelle Reed
- Staff: 81
- Grades: 9–12 & SE
- Enrollment: 428
- Color: Navy
- Mascot: Lions
- Nickname: Chelsea
- Budget: $2,576,752
- Website: www.chelseahs.org

Chelsea Career & Technical Education High School (formerly Chelsea Vocational High School, NYCDOE#M615) is a public Career and Technical Education (CTE) high school located at 131 Avenue of the Americas, New York, New York. It is a part of district 2 in the New York City Department of Education.

== History ==
In 2011 the school began obtaining a $1 million grant and used it to buy electronic equipment.

== Curriculum ==
The curriculum at Chelsea is arranged so that all students may take their chosen CTE sequence, while earning a regular or advanced regents high school diploma. Each student is required to take the same classes as the average high school student, with the exception that the foreign language requirement is only 2 credits (one full year instead of three). The only language offered is Spanish. In the requirements for an Advanced Regents diploma, the foreign language proficiency regent is exempted due to the many hours of their CTE sequences, averaging a full hour every day. In addition, Chelsea has Advanced Placement (AP) courses which include Calculus AB, English Literature and Composition, Government and Politics: United States, Physics C: Mechanics, Spanish Language, and United States History.

== CTE shop classes ==
The shops (information technology and graphic design) are all pre-approved programs by the Department of Education and related industries. Each program has its own certification to be obtained by taking a test in the senior year, and all have internship opportunities.

CTE program	Curriculum
Chelsea Technical Academy/Cisco	Chelsea Technical Academy includes: C-Tech (a realistic hands-on training in systems and methods in the telecommunication fields); Cisco (centers on computer networking); and A+ certification (the design, development, support and management of computer systems)
SoHo Communication Arts Academy	Commercial and Fine Arts, including Creative Design and Photoshop

Additionally, based on industry and DOE standards, a student graduating from Chelsea High School may be eligible for a Technical Endorsement seal on their diploma, which is equivalent to work experience of two years related to their CTE sequence.

== Athletics and extracurricular activities ==
Categories	Activities/Clubs
Leadership & Support	Student government
Academic	National Honor Society, Chelsea SAT (Prep SAT Program), Math Tutoring
Artistic	Dance, Drama, Music, and Yearbook
Trade-Related	Prescholars internship program, Chelsea newspaper, SCRATCH

PSAL Teams	Sports
Boys	Baseball & JV Baseball, Basketball & JV Basketball, Bowling, Cross Country, Handball, Indoor Track
Girls	Basketball, Bowling, Cross Country, Softball
