= Romeo Acquarone =

French tennis player (1895–1980)

- Country (sports): Monaco & France
- Born: 22 June 1895; Monaco
- Died: 19 January 1980 (aged 84); Cannes, France

Romeo Acquarone (1895 – 1980) was a professional tennis player born in Monaco. He became a French citizen in 1937. Acquarone won the Bristol Cup in France in 1920 (beating Joseph Negro in the final). The Bristol Cup was the top professional tournament in the world in the 1920s.
