= Cry of Asencio =

Spanish Rebellion

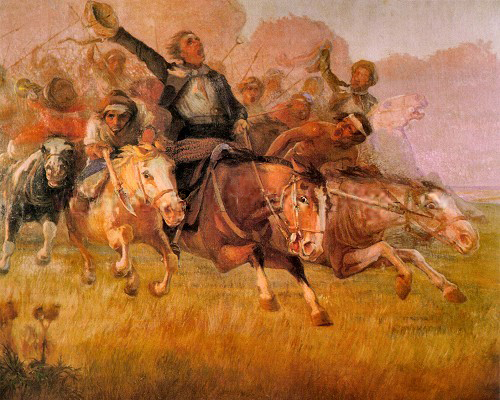
- La Mañana de Asencio, portrait by Carlos María Herrera.
- Date: February 28, 1811
- Location: Mercedes and Santo Domingo de Soriano
- Also known as: Admirable alarm
- Participants: Uruguayan patriots
- Outcome: Begin of the Uruguayan theater of the Spanish American wars of independence

The Cry of Asencio (Spanish: Grito de Asencio) or Admirable alarm (Spanish: Admirable alarma) was an 1811 pronunciamiento that took place at the Banda Oriental (modern Uruguay) against the Spanish rule in Montevideo. Made in support of Buenos Aires, which had already ousted the viceroy and established a local government during the May Revolution, it is considered the beginning of the Oriental revolution.

== History ==
=== Antecedents ===
Montevideo and Buenos Aires were part of the Viceroyalty of the Río de la Plata, a Spanish colony in South America. The Peninsular War in Spain generated a political crisis at the Spanish colonies, as the king Ferdinand VII of Spain was captured by the Napoleonic forces. Buenos Aires, the capital of the viceroyalty, ousted the viceroy Baltasar Hidalgo de Cisneros in 1810 during the May Revolution, and established a local government, the Primera Junta. Montevideo did not accept the authority of the new Junta, and acknowledged the Cortes of Cádiz as the legitimate Spanish authority. As a result of Buenos Aires's rebellion, Montevideo was appointed the new capital of the Viceroyalty, and governor Francisco Javier de Elío was promoted to viceroy.

The villages near Montevideo supported Elío, while the villages linked to Buenos Aires supported the Junta. Elío declared war to Buenos Aires on February 12, 1811. He arranged many new taxes to support the war effort, which harmed the local economy, already weakened by the Peninsular War.

=== The conflict ===
Many criollo military enlisted in the Spanish forces defected from them and joined the resistance against Montevideo. This is the case of José Gervasio Artigas, who defected from Colonia del Sacramento on February 15, asking Buenos Aires support for their rebellion. The rebellion took place on February 28, and it was headed by Venancio Benavídez and Pedro Viera, following instructions from Artigas. Nearly a hundred men met next to the Asencio stream, and rejected the authority of Elío. the villages of San Carlos, Minas, Maldonado, Durazno, Canelones and Pantanoso soon joined the pronouncing against the Spanish rule.

They captured the village of Mercedes in the morning, and Viera captured Santo Domingo de Soriano in the afternoon, the same day. Artigas joined the fight shortly afterwards. Rosario and San José de Mayo would be captured in April, followed by the first victory in an open military conflict against the Royalists in the battle of San José.

== Legacy ==
The Cry of Asencio is considered the initial step of the Uruguayan theater of the Spanish American wars of independence. The Uruguay bicentennial was held on February 28, 2011.

== Bibliography ==
- Abad de Santillán, Diego. Historia Argentina (in Spanish). Buenos Aires: TEA (Tipográfica Editora Argentina).

== See also ==
- First Siege of Montevideo
- Battle of Las Piedras (1811)
