= José Gervasio Artigas =

Uruguayan military leader during the War for Independence

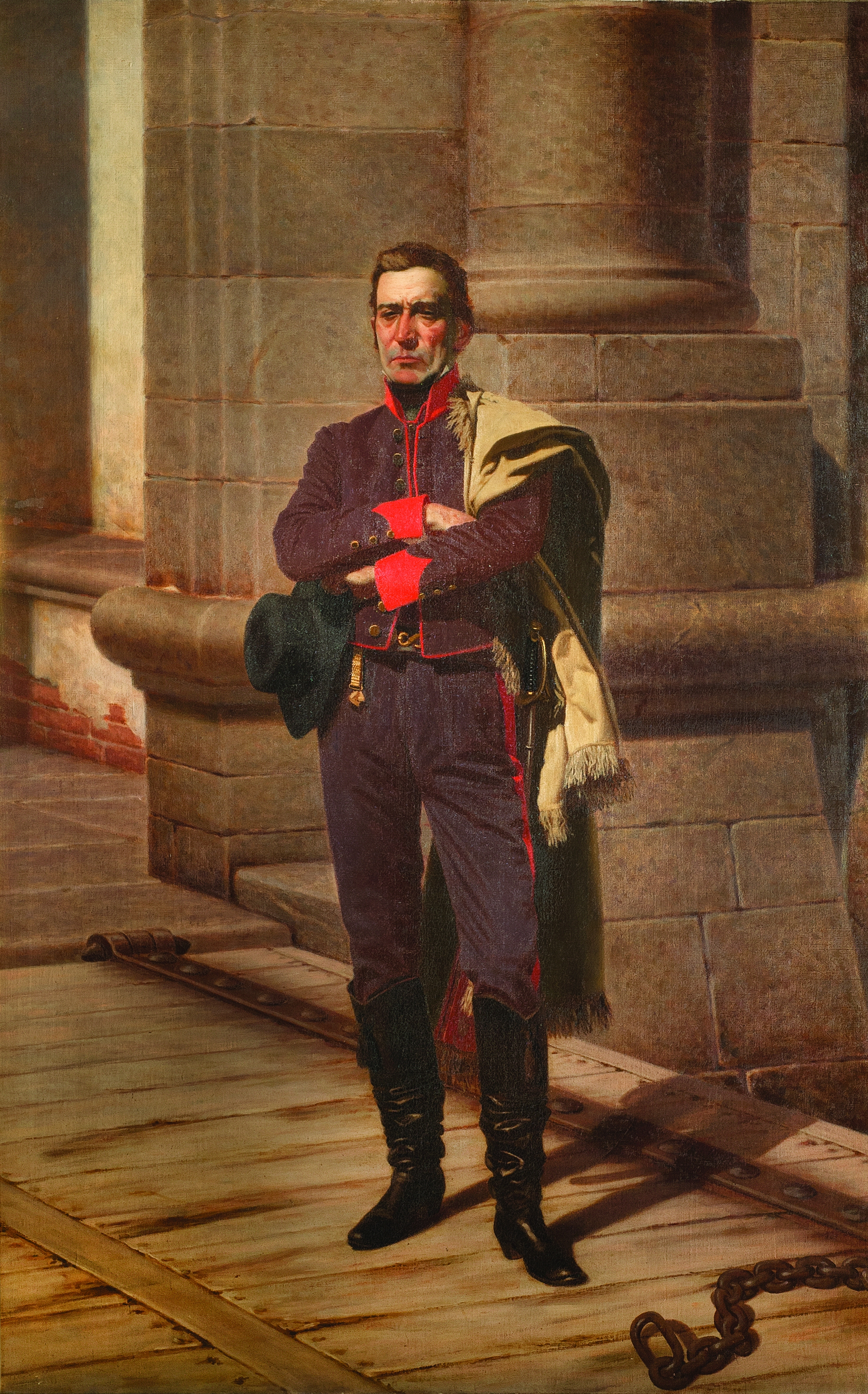
- Artigas en la Ciudadela by Juan Manuel Blanes
- Born: June 19, 1764; Montevideo, Viceroyalty of Peru
- Died: September 23, 1850 (aged 86); Asunción, Paraguay
- Burial place: Plaza Independencia
- Military career
- Allegiance: United Provinces of the Río de la Plata
- Service years: 1797–1820
- Rank: General
- Nickname: Karaí-Guasú
- Conflicts: British invasions of the River Plate; Portuguese invasion of the Banda Oriental (1811–12); Argentine War of Independence; Portuguese conquest of the Banda Oriental; Argentine Civil Wars

José Gervasio Artigas Arnal (Spanish pronunciation: [xoˈse xeɾˈβa.sjo aɾˈti.ɣas aɾˈnal]; June 19, 1764 – September 23, 1850) was a soldier and statesman who is regarded as a national hero in Uruguay and the Father of the Nation.

Born in Montevideo, Artigas enlisted in the Spanish military in 1797 and fought the British in the Anglo-Spanish War. At the outbreak of the Spanish-American wars of independence, Artigas supported the Primera Junta in Buenos Aires against Spain. He defeated the Spanish royalists at Las Piedras and laid siege to Montevideo, but was forced to withdraw in the face of Portuguese intervention. Artigas subsequently broke with the centralist government of Buenos Aires and took over Montevideo in 1815. He then oversaw the creation of the Federal League, an alliance of six provinces under a federal style of government.

In 1816, the United Kingdom of Portugal, Brazil and the Algarves invaded the Banda Oriental, eventually annexing it as a province. Artigas was driven into Paraguay, where he lived in exile until his death in 1850.

== Biography ==
=== Early life ===
Artigas was born in Montevideo on June 19, 1764. His grandparents were from Zaragoza, Buenos Aires and Tenerife (Canary Islands). His grandparents fought in the War of the Spanish Succession and moved to the Americas to escape from poverty, settling in Buenos Aires in 1716. Artigas was the son of Martín José Artigas and Francisca Antonia Arnal, who came from a wealthy family. His parents enrolled him in the Colegio de San Bernardino, to pursue religious studies, but Artigas refused to submit to the school's strict discipline. Before he left the school, he developed a strong friendship with Fernando Otorgues, who would work with him in later years. At the age of 12, he moved to the countryside and worked on his family's farms. His contact with the customs and perspectives of gauchos and Indians made a great impression on him. Once he had come of age, he distanced himself from his parents and became involved in cattle smuggling. This made him a wanted man among the owners of haciendas and with the government in Montevideo. A reward was put out for his death.

Things changed with the opening of the Anglo-Spanish War, and the threat of a British invasion upon the viceroyalty. The viceroy Antonio de Olaguer y Feliú negotiated a pardon with his family, on the condition that he joined the Corps of Blandengues with a hundred men, to form a battalion. Thus, he began his military career in 1797, at the age of 33, with the rank of lieutenant. The attack finally came in 1806, when William Beresford invaded Buenos Aires, in the first British invasion of the River Plate. Although Artigas's unit was tasked with patrolling the frontier with Brazil, he requested to take part in the military expedition that Santiago de Liniers launched from Montevideo to drive the British out of Buenos Aires. His request was granted, and the British were defeated. After the recapture of Buenos Aires, he was tasked with returning to Montevideo and informing the governor Pascual Ruiz Huidobro of the result of the battle. A second British invasion was launched culminating in the Battle of Montevideo, which ended in the fall of Montevideo. Artigas was taken prisoner, but he managed to escape and took refuge in the countryside. He organized groups of gauchos and began a guerrilla war against the British. The British tried to capture Buenos Aires a second time. They were defeated by the local troops and returned Montevideo to Spanish control as part of the terms of capitulation. Artigas was promoted to captain in 1809.

=== Oriental revolution ===
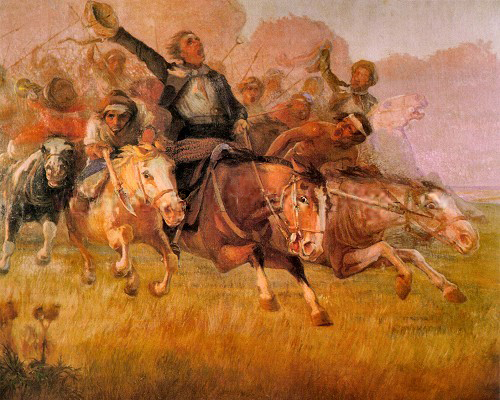
La Mañana de Asencio, portrait by Carlos María Herrera about the cry of Asencio.

The ideas of the Age of Enlightenment and the outbreak of the Peninsular War (from 1807 to 1814) in Spain, along with the capture of King Ferdinand VII, generated political turbulence all across the Spanish Empire. The absence of the king from the throne (replaced by the French Joseph Bonaparte) and the new ideas of the Enlightenment sparked the Spanish-American wars of independence, between patriots (who wanted to establish republics or constitutional monarchies) and royalists (who wanted to keep an absolute monarchy). Artigas, who thought that the gauchos were not treated well, supported the new ideas.

Buenos Aires deposed the viceroy in 1810, during the May Revolution, replacing him with the Primera Junta.

Spain declared Buenos Aires a rogue city, and appointed Montevideo as the new capital, with Francisco Javier de Elío, who was an experienced hard-line colonialist from Cádiz, as the new viceroy. In February 1811, he declared war on Buenos Aires and this sparked the independence movement of Banda Oriental. Mariano Moreno, the Argentine secretary of war, wrote at the Operations plan that Artigas would be a decisive ally against the royalists in Montevideo, and called him for an interview. However, by the time Artigas arrived in Buenos Aires, Moreno had already left the government. He was still welcomed, but received little help. He was promoted to colonel and received some weapons, money and 150 men, very little to organize a rebellion at the Banda Oriental. This was the last time Artigas saw the city of Buenos Aires.

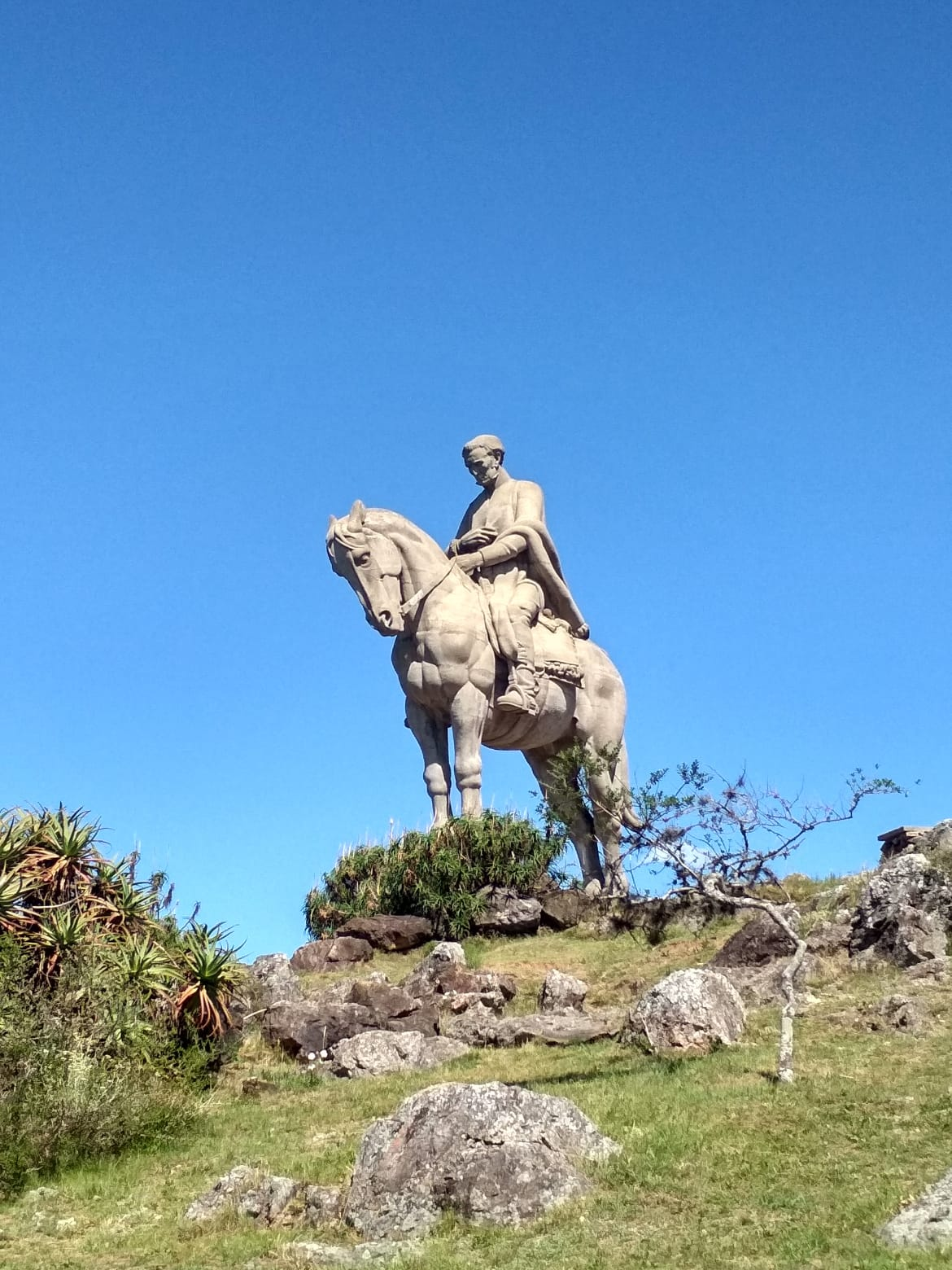
Equestrian monument of Artigas in Minas, Uruguay.

The alliance between Artigas and the Argentines sustained initial successes, particularly in the late 1810 to mid-1811. Montevideo had financial problems, however, and the measures taken by Elío to maintain the royalist armies were highly unpopular in the countryside. This allowed Artigas to channel the popular discontent against the colonial authorities. A hundred men met near the Asencio stream and made the cry of Asencio, a pronunciamiento against the viceroy. They captured many villages in the Banda Oriental, such as Mercedes, Santo Domingo, Colla, Maldonado, Paso del Rey, Santa Teresa and San José. They also captured Gualeguay, Gualeguaychú and Arroyo de la China, the west of the Uruguay River.

Elío sent some soldiers to kill Artigas, but they failed to accomplish their mission. Then, he sent Manuel Villagrán, a relative of Artigas, to offer him a pardon and appoint him general and military leader of the Banda Oriental if he gave up the rebellion. Artigas considered the offer an insult, and sent Villagrán prisoner to Buenos Aires.

Montevideo was soon surrounded by Artigas's forces. A Montevidean army tried to stop the patriots at the Battle of Las Piedras, but they were defeated, and the city was put under siege. José Rondeau, commanding forces from Buenos Aires, joined the siege. Artigas wanted to attack the city right away, but Rondeau thought that there would be less loss of lives by establishing a blockade and waiting for the city to surrender. However, the besiegers did not consider the naval forces of Montevideo, who kept the city supplied and enabled them to endure the blockade.

On the verge of defeat, Elío allied himself with Brazilian forces, requesting their intervention in the conflict. Dom Diogo de Sousa entered the Banda Oriental, leading an army of five thousand men. This added to the Argentinian defeat of Manuel Belgrano at the Paraguay campaign, the defeat of Juan José Castelli at the First Upper Peru campaign and the Montevidean naval blockade of Buenos Aires. Fearing a complete defeat, Buenos Aires signed a truce with Elío, recognizing him as the ruler of the Banda Oriental and half of Entre Ríos. Artigas felt the truce to be treasonous. He broke relations with the city, and lifted the blockade over Montevideo.

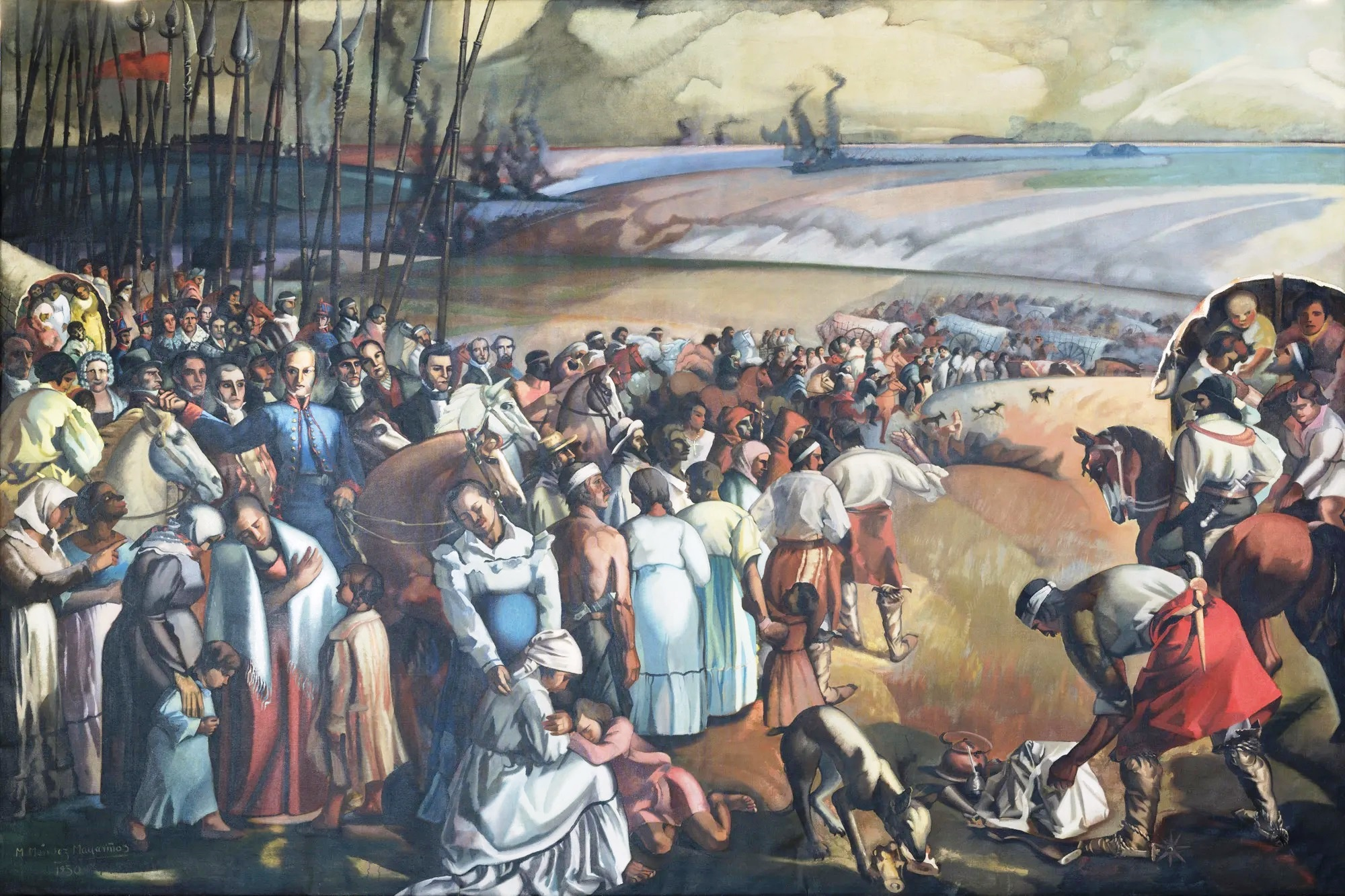
Portrait of the Oriental exodus.

Artigas left the Banda Oriental and moved to Salto Chico, in Entre Ríos. All his supporters moved with him. This massive departure is known as the Oriental exodus.

The Supreme Director Gervasio Antonio de Posadas offered a reward of $6.000 for the capture of Artigas, dead or alive. The only consequence of this action was increased resentment of the Orientals towards Buenos Aires. Several royalist leaders, such as Vigodet or Pezuela, sought an alliance with Artigas against Buenos Aires, but he rejected them: "I may not be sold, nor do I want more reward for my efforts than to see my nation free from the Spanish rule". Despite the deep disputes, Artigas was still eager to return to good terms with Buenos Aires, but only if the city accepted a national organization based on federalist principles.

Posadas sent two more armies to capture and execute Artigas, but they mutinied and joined the Orientals. When the Artiguist influence expanded to Corrientes, Posadas sought to negotiate by accepting the autonomy of the provinces. Artigas accepted the terms, but clarified that such autonomy must not be understood as national independence. He did not want to secede the Banda Oriental from the United provinces, but to organize them as a confederation. Posadas, who supported the authority of Buenos Aires as the head of a centralized state, delayed the approval of the treaty.

Buenos Aires renewed the military actions against Montevideo. This time, the naval skills of Argentinian William Brown helped to overcome the strength of the Montevidean navy, leading to the final defeat of the royalist stronghold. Carlos María de Alvear led the capture of Montevideo, and lured Artigas there by promising that he would turn over the city to the Oriental patriots. Alvear attacked them without warning at Las Piedras, but Artigas managed to escape from the trap.

=== Liga Federal ===
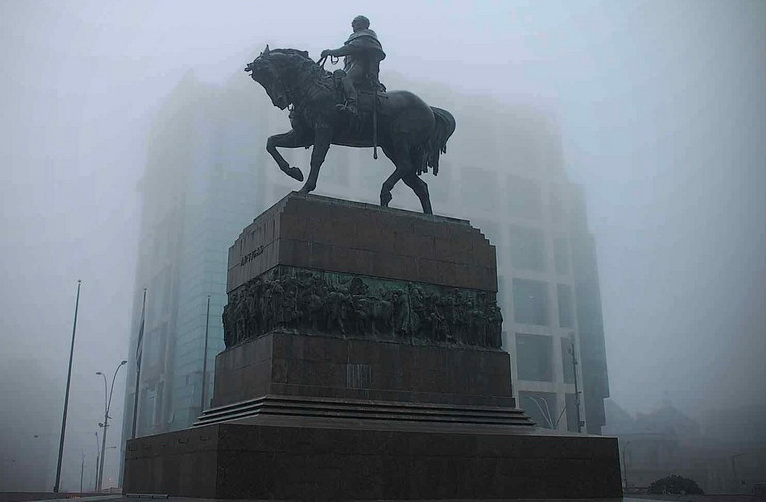
Artigas Mausoleum at Plaza Independencia in Montevideo.

In 1814, Artigas organized the Liga de los Pueblos Libres (League of the Free Peoples), of which he was declared Protector. In the following year, he liberated Montevideo from the control of the "Unitarians" from Buenos Aires.

In 1815, Artigas attended the Congress of Oriente, a year before the Congress of Tucuman, held in Arrollo de la China (today known as Concepción del Uruguay). It was at this congress that the provinces of the Oriental Province (today the country of Uruguay), Córdoba, Corrientes, Entre Ríos, Misiones and Santa Fe declared themselves independent from Spain and formed the Liga Federal ("Federal League"). The Liga Federal invited other provinces of the former Viceroyalty of the Rio de la Plata to join them under a federal system.

In this congress, Artigas rectified the use of the flag created by Manuel Belgrano (which would later become the flag of the Argentine Republic), adding a diagonal festoon in red, the color of federalism in Argentina at that time, and changing the Borbonic light blue for Revolutionary dark blue.

=== Luso Brazilian invasion ===
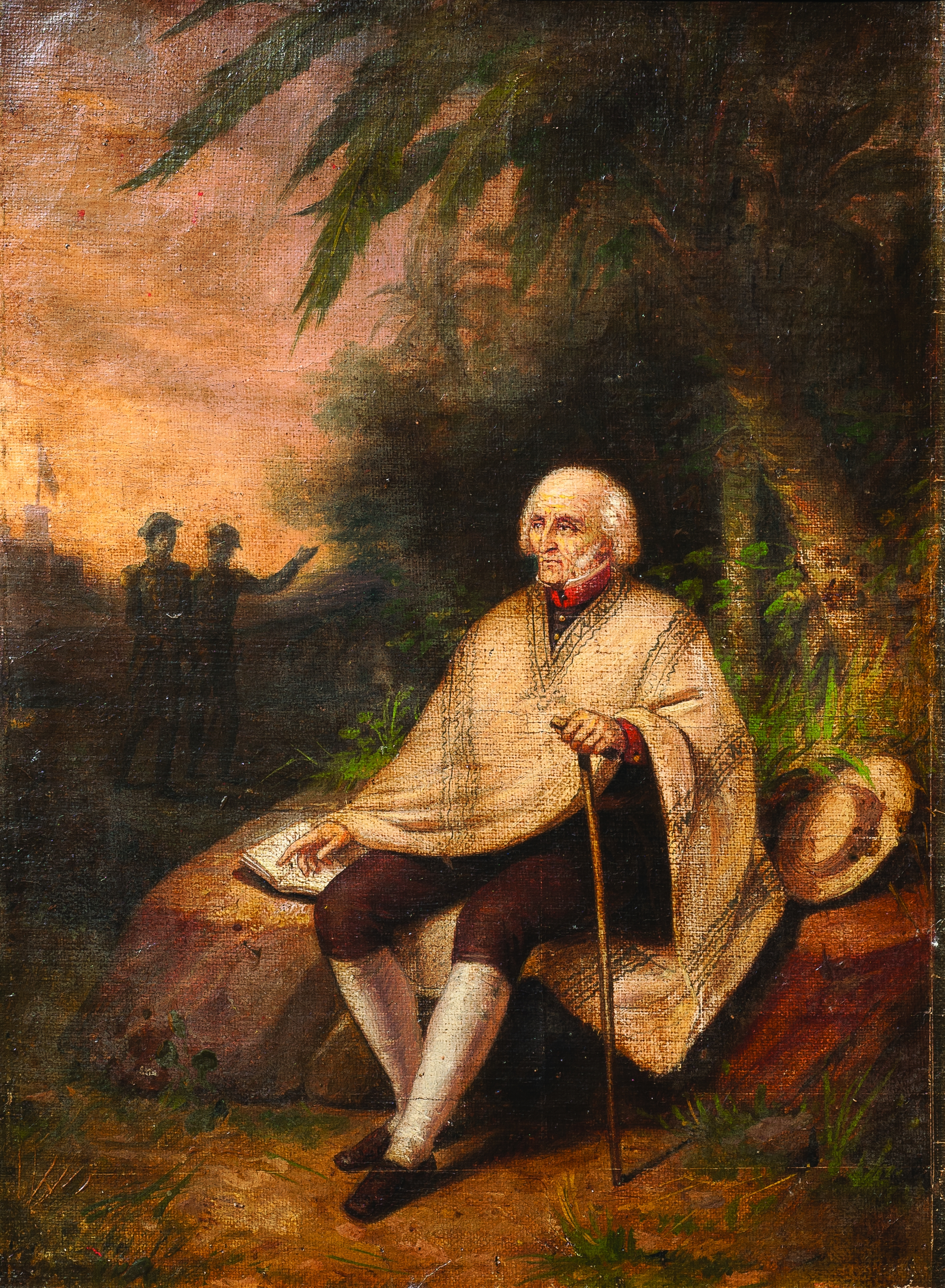
"Artigas in Paraguay", painting by Eduardo Dionisio Carbajal.

The continued growth of influence and prestige of the Federal League frightened the governments in Buenos Aires (because of its federalism) and Portugal (because of its republicanism), and in August 1816, Portugal invaded the Eastern Province (with tacit complicity from Buenos Aires), with the intention of destroying Artigas and his revolution.

The Portuguese forces, led by Carlos Frederico Lecor, captured Artigas and his deputies and occupied Montevideo on 20 January 1817, but the struggle continued for three years in the countryside. Infuriated by Buenos Aires's passivity, Artigas declared war on Buenos Aires while he was losing to the Portuguese. His subordinates, members of the Federal League—Francisco Ramírez, governor of Entre Ríos, and Estanislao López, governor of Santa Fe—managed to defeat the centralism of Buenos Aires. But hope for a new nation was short-lived; both commanders entered agreements with Buenos Aires that went against the principles of Artigas. They rebelled against him and left him to be crushed by the Portuguese.

Without resources and men, Artigas withdrew to Paraguay in September 1820. In Paraguay, Dr. Francia, the dictator, banished him to Candelaria. He then disappeared from the political life of the region.

After a long exile, he died in Paraguay on 23 September 1850, aged 86. It is said that Artigas, feeling himself to be near death, asked for a horse and died in the saddle, as a gaucho. His remains were buried and then re-interred at the Panteón Nacional in 1855. On 19 June 1977, his remains were transferred to the Artigas Mausoleum in the centre of the Plaza Independencia.

== Ideals ==
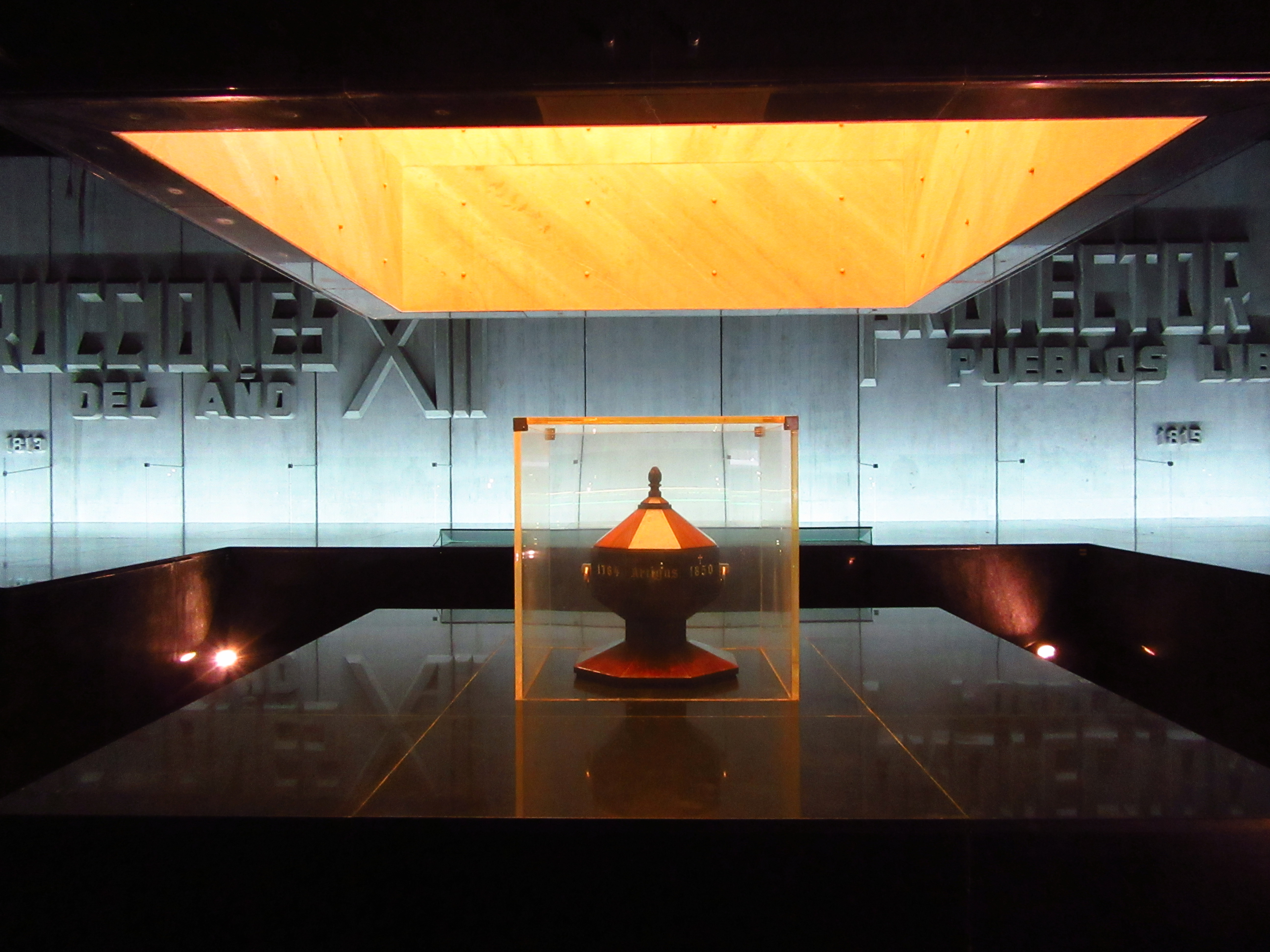
Artigas funeral urn in its Mausoleum.

Artigas was a staunch democrat and federalist, opposed to monarchism and centralism.

Artiguism has two main sources: the works of American authors such as Thomas Paine (supporters of federalism) and the French authors of the Enlightenment as Jean-Jacques Rousseau. Some books Artigas read in his teens include Paine's Common Sense and Rousseau's The Social Contract. The first "Caudillo" or Founding Father of the La Plata territory seems to be inspired more in the British enlightenment than from the French.

The ideology of Artigas is partially taken from U.S. legal texts. The American political liberalism exerted a strong influence on Artigas. Other Hispanic independence leaders, however, were more influenced by the French Revolution and the authors of France. Some historians such as Eugenio Petit Muñoz and Ariosto González, have shown that some paragraphs of the Artiguist documents were taken directly from "The Independence of the Mainland Justified by Thomas Paine, Thirty Years Ago" published by Paine in Philadelphia in 1811 and translated immediately into Spanish, and "Concise History of the United States" by John McCulloch. Artigas had both books.

The first of the works cited contained a large appendix of documents with the United States Declaration of Independence, the Federal Constitution of 1787 and the State Constitutions of Massachusetts, New Jersey, Pennsylvania and Virginia.

== Legacy ==
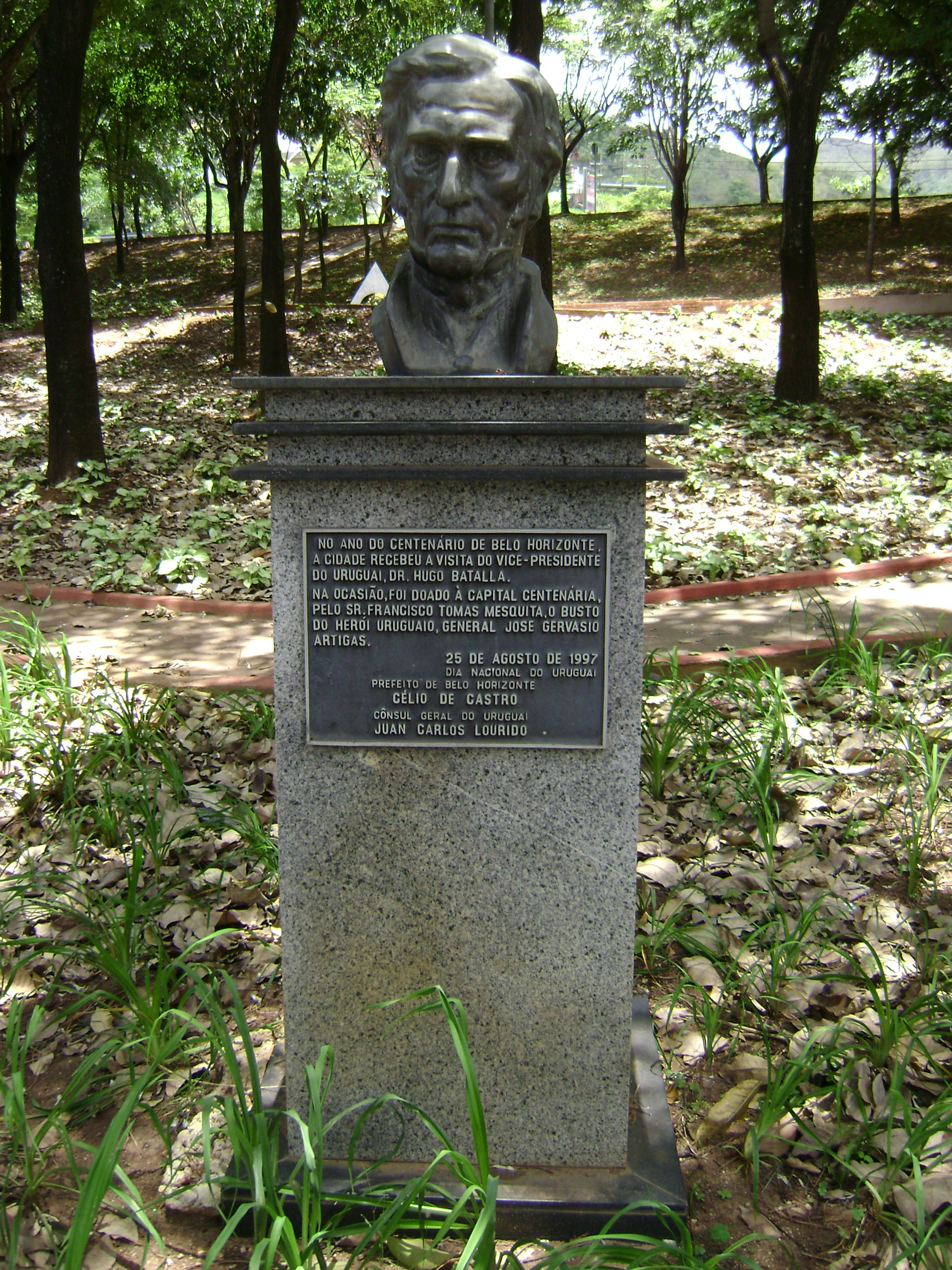
Bust of Artigas in Belo Horizonte.

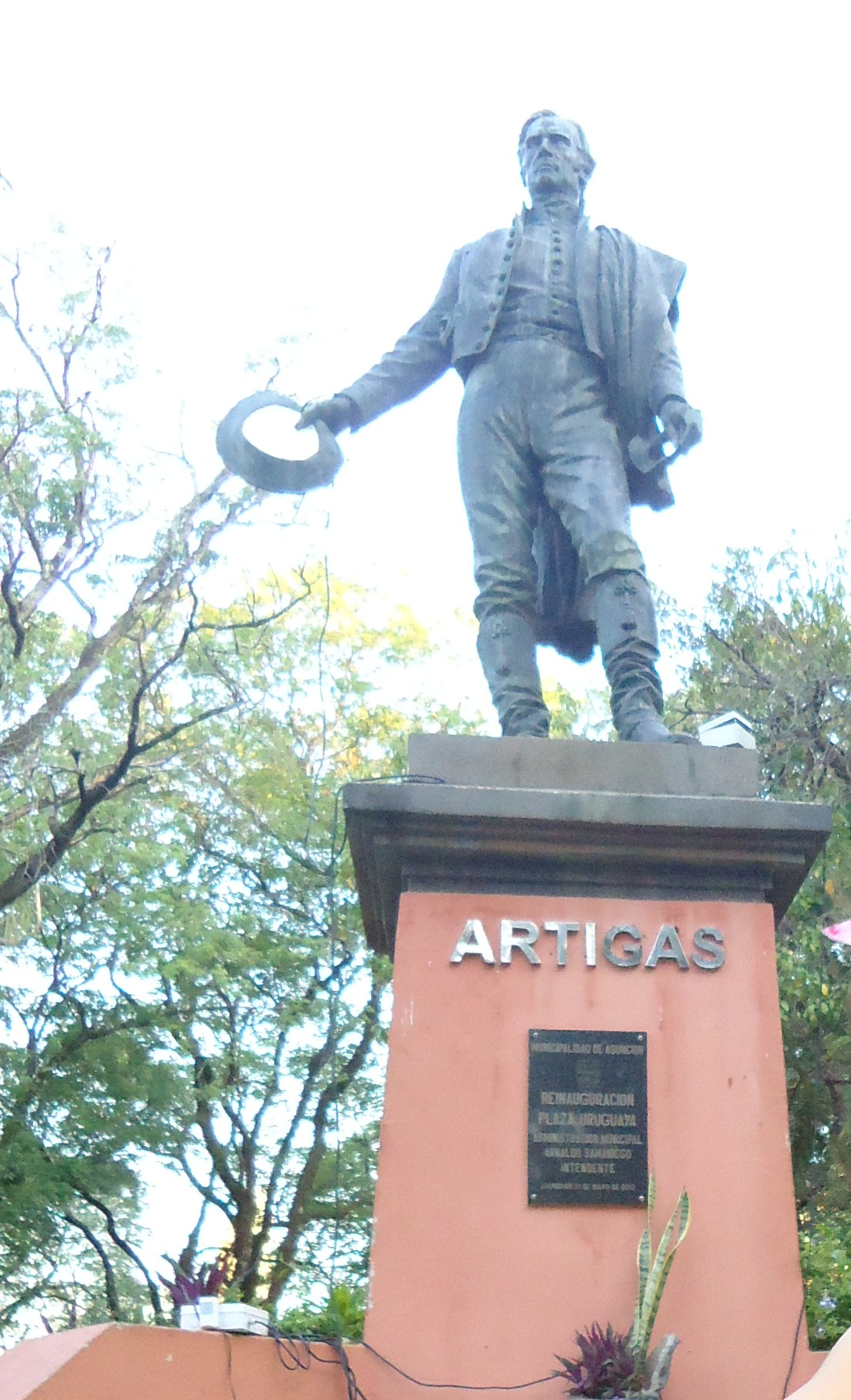
Statue of Artigas in Plaza Uruguaya, Asunción.

Artigas has become a national hero in Uruguay. This is significant as, since independence, many Uruguayan figures have been heroes of either the Colorado or the Blanco party, while being reviled by the other side. As such, Artigas has been the namesake of numerous places, vessels, etc. throughout Uruguayan history, particularly during periods of peace and reunification between the parties.

- Artigas Department, the northernmost region of Uruguay (formed 1 October 1884 from Salto Department).
- Artigas, the homonymous capital of the aforementioned department (established 1852).
- Artigas Airport (SUAG/ATI), its airport.
- General Artigas Bridge, which connects Paysandú, Uruguay and Colón, Argentina (completed 1975).
- Fortress General Artigas, a military museum on Montevideo Hill (completed 1809, renamed 1882, rededicated 1916).
- General Artigas railway station, the former main railway station in Montevideo, Uruguay.
- General Artigas Military Club in Montevideo (established 1925).
- General Artigas Military School in Montevideo (established 1947).
- Artigas Base, Uruguay's Antarctic research station (established 1984).
- The Uruguayan 1st Cavalry Regiment (Reg. "Blandengues de Artigas" de Caballería Nº 1).
- The ROU 04 General Artigas, a converted German Lüneburg (E)-class replenishment oiler (commissioned 2005).
- The former ROU 02 General Artigas, a converted French Commandant Rivière-class frigate (commissioned 1988, decommissioned 2005).
- The former ROU Artigas (DE-2), a converted American Cannon-class destroyer escort (commissioned 1952, decommissioned 1988).
- The former General Artigas, an Uruguayan (Austro-Hungarian built) gunboat (commissioned 1884, decommissioned 1915).
- The former steamship General Artigas, employed by President Flores during his successful rebellion.
- The Artigas flag, flown outside Uruguayan government buildings and used by all branches of the Armed Forces.
- The Plaza Uruguay in Polanco, in Mexico City has a statue of Artigas.
- A statue of Artigas stand on Constitution Avenue in Washington, D.C.

Artigas's birthday (19 June) is celebrated as a national holiday in Uruguay.

Other statues of Artigas stand on 6th Avenue in Spring Street Park, New York; in Plaza Artigas Salto, Uruguay; in Caracas, Venezuela; in Athens, Greece; in Newark, New Jersey; in Quito, Ecuador as well as in the town centre of Montevideo, Minnesota and in Punta del Este, Uruguay. Asunción, Paraguay has a statue of Artigas in its Plaza Uruguaya, and the Calle Sebastián Gaboto was renamed the Avenida Artigas in his honor in 1926. An imposing monument of the Uruguayan caudillo stands in Buenos Aires' Recoleta district on the Avenida Libertador, the work of Uruguayan sculptor Juan José Zorrilla de San Martín and architect Alejandro Bustillo. A bust of José Gervasio Artigas can be also found at Luis Muñoz Rivera Park in San Juan, Puerto Rico.

The Crest of Club Nacional de Football is inspired by the Artigas flag.

Additionally, an extinct giant rodent genus, whose fossils were first found in San José Department, was named Josephoartigasia after José Artigas.

There is also a monument and square dedicated to Artigas in Rome, in the Villa Borghese park, Italy.

There is a monument in honor of José Artigas in Bucharest, Romania.

There is a monument in honor of José Artigas in Sofia, Bulgaria.

Jose Artigas Marg is a street named in honor of Jose Artigas in New Delhi, India.

There is a bust of Artigas and an abstract sculpture representing his flag in Avenida do Uruguai, Lisbon, Portugal.

There is an order of Merit, the Order of Military Merit of the Companions of Artigas, founded in 1980.

There is one in Elizabeth, New Jersey, United States, April 19, 2013.

His remains were re-interred at the Central Cemetery of Montevideo in 1855, and in 1977 they were transferred to the Artigas Mausoleum.

== See also ==
- Artiguism
- Artigas flag
- Order of Military Merit of the Companions of Artigas#Historical reference
- Statues of the Liberators
