= Diógenes Hequet =

Uruguayan artist (1866–1902)

Juan Bautista Diógenes Hequet
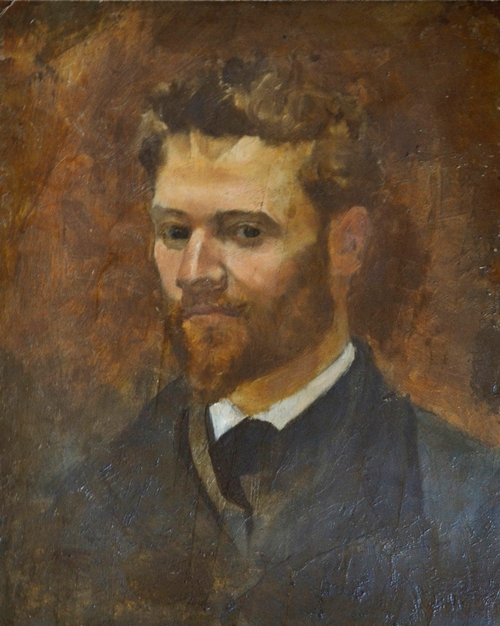
- Self-portrait (c. 1890)
- Born: Juan Bautista Diógenes Hequet; September 26, 1866; Montevideo, Uruguay
- Died: August 28, 1902 (aged 35); Montevideo, Uruguay
- Education: Municipal Art School, Paris
- Known for: Painting, Lithography, Graphic Art
- Notable work: Episodios Nacionales series (historical battle paintings)
- Style: Realism, Military Art, Nativism
- Father: José Adolfo Hequet

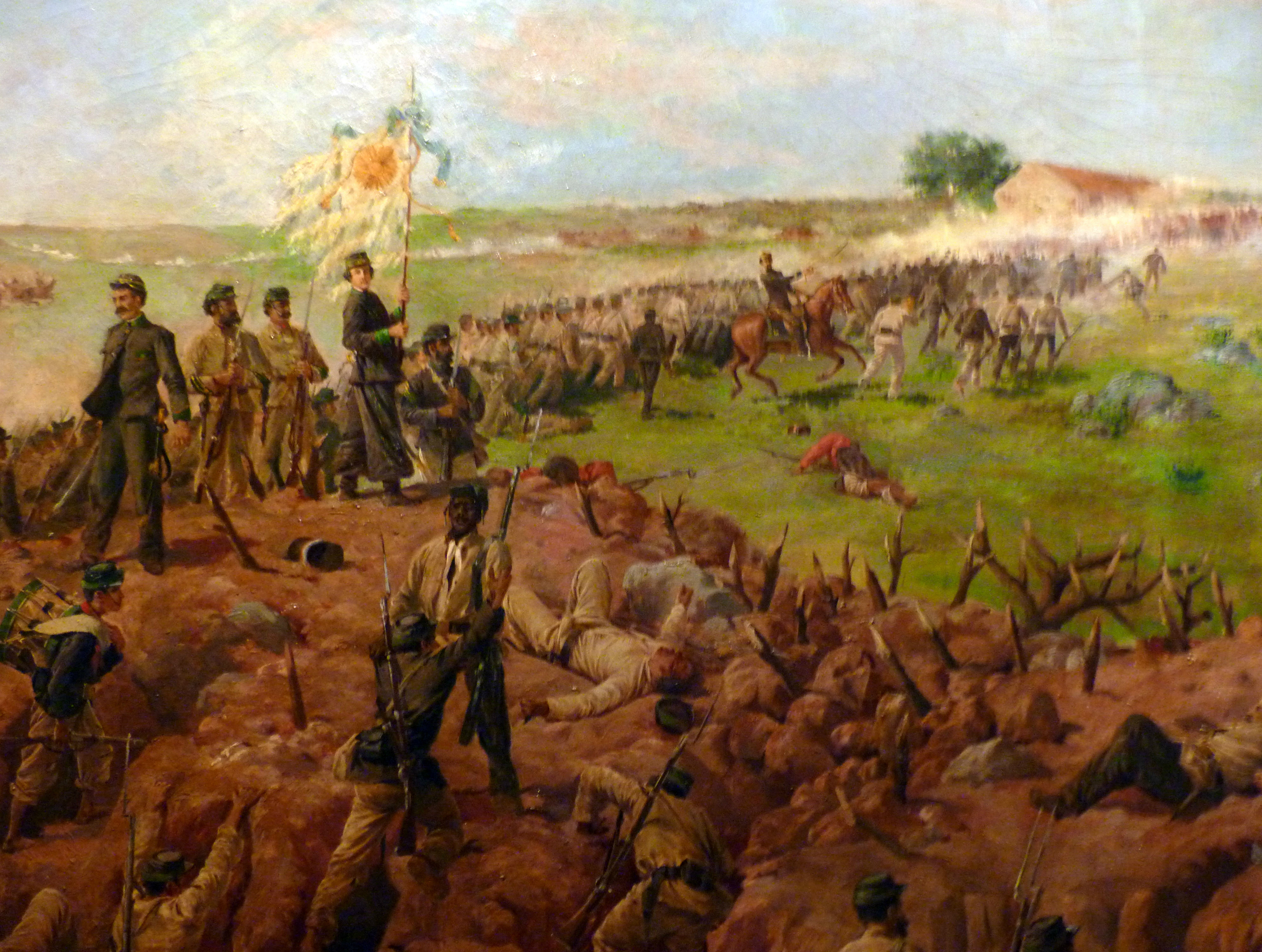
The Battle of Lomas Valentinas

Juan Bautista Diógenes Hequet, or Hecquet (26 September 1866 – 28 August 1902) was an Uruguayan painter, graphic artist and professor, best known for his battle scenes.

== Biography ==
He was born in Montevideo. His first art lessons were in the workshop of his father, the French-born lithographer José Adolfo Hequet (1826–1888). In 1886, he went to Paris to perfect his etching techniques with Louis Tauzin. Two years later, he enrolled at the municipal art school in the 14th arrondissement, operated by Auguste Truphème. It was there that he first became interested in military art and was influenced by the works of Meissonier, Neuville and Detaille.

Upon returning to Montevideo, he set about producing a large number of historical works. Outstanding among these was a series called "Episodios Nacionales", that depicted all of the principal events in the history of Uruguay, including the "Cry of Asencio" and the "Battle of Las Piedras". In addition to these works, he also created nativist works depicting peasant life and rural landscapes.

In 1893, he made an unsuccessful effort to establish a new school of fine arts. Later he joined with several other Uruguayan artists to create the "Artistic Circle of Uruguay". Juan Manuel Blanes was its first President.

Shortly after, he became a professor at the University of the Republic, where he held the chairs of drawing (in the "Sección Preparatoria") and ornament (in the "Facultad de Matemáticas"); positions he held until his death. He also provided illustrations for several magazines and newspapers.
