= Timeline of Montevideo =

The following is a timeline of the history of the city of Montevideo, Uruguay.

== 18th century ==
- 1724 – Ciudad Vieja, Montevideo (Historic City Centre) founded.
- 1726 – Settlement established by Spaniard Bruno Mauricio de Zabala.
- 1778 – Free port status acquired.
- 1797 – 31 August: British ship Lady Shore arrives in harbour.

== 19th century ==
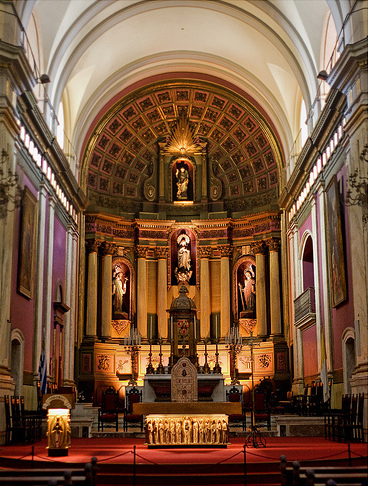
Montevideo Metropolitan Cathedral was consecrated in 1804

- 1804 – Montevideo Metropolitan Cathedral consecrated.
- 1807
  - 3 February: City besieged by British forces; British take city.
  - Printing press in operation.
  - Southern Star newspaper in publication.
  - September: British occupation ends.
- 1811 – Siege of Montevideo by forces of the United Provinces of the River Plate.
- 1812
  - Montevideo Cabildo built.
  - Siege of Montevideo (1812-1814) begins.
- 1814 – Siege ends; Spanish loyalists surrender.
- 1817 – 20 January: city occupied by Luso-Brazilian forces.
- 1821 – City becomes part of Brazilian province Cisplatina.
- 1823 – Siege of Montevideo (1823)
- 1825 – Hospital de Caridad founded.
- 1828
  - City becomes capital of independent Oriental Republic of Uruguay.
  - British Cemetery established.
- 1829 – City wall dismantled.
- ca.1830 - Plaza Independencia established
- 1830 – National museum founded.
- 1833 – Public library founded.
- 1840 - Plaza de Cagancha named.
- 1843 – Great Siege of Montevideo begins.
- 1847 – Anglican church built.
- 1849 – University of the Republic founded.
- 1851 – Great Siege of Montevideo ends.
- 1856
  - Solís Theatre built.
  - Salesas convent founded.
  - Epidemic.
- 1857 – British hospital founded.
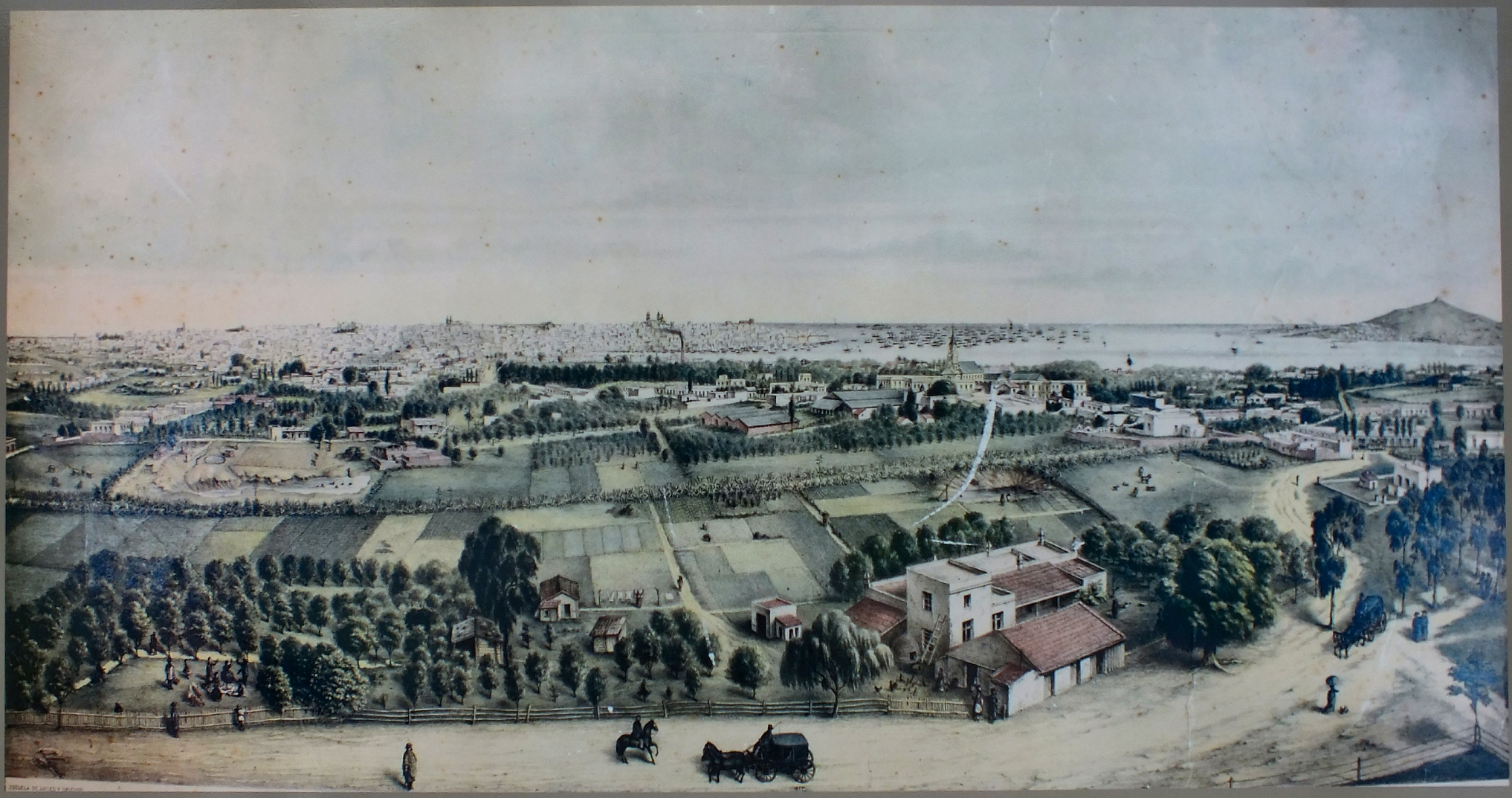
  Montevideo in the 19th century
- 1858 – Church of the Immaculate Conception built.
- 1862 – Hotel Oriental built.
- 1863 – Bolsa (exchange) built.
- 1866 – Post office built.
- 1868 – Mercado del Puerto built.
- 1871 – Teatro Cibils inaugurated.
- 1874 – Estévez Palace built.
- 1876 – Punta Brava Lighthouse erected.
- 1879 – Population: 91,167.
- 1880 – Nuevo Teatro San Felipe opens.
- 1885 – Escuela Brasil (school) established.
- 1889 – Teatro Nuevo Politeama inaugurated.
- 1895 – Teatro Stella d'Italia founded.
- 1900 – Estadio Gran Parque Central opens.

== 20th century ==
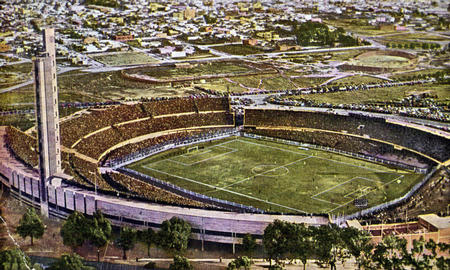
The Estadio Centenario opened for the 1930 FIFA World Cup

- 1905 – Teatro Urquiza inaugurated.
- 1906 – Electric streetcar begins operating.
- 1908
  - Municipality of Montevideo created.
  - Daniel Muñoz becomes Intendant of Montevideo.
  - Immigrants' Hotel opens.
  - Edificio London París completed.
  - Population: 312,946.(estimate).
- 1909 – Urbano hotel in business.
- 1910 – Teatro 18 de Julio opens.
- 1911
  - National Museum of Visual Arts (Uruguay) inaugurated.
  - May: General strike.
- 1913 – Villa del Cerro and La Teja become part of city.
- 1924 - Nuestra Señora del Carmen, Cordón, Montevideo current church built.
- 1925 – Palacio Legislativo (Uruguay) built.
- 1928 - Palacio Salvo finished.
- 1930
  - Estadio Centenario opens.
  - July: 1930 FIFA World Cup held.
  - Juan Manuel Blanes Museum established.
  - Obelisk of Montevideo built.
  - Port of Montevideo major engineering works completed.
- 1933
  - International Conference of American States held; Montevideo Convention on the Rights and Duties of States signed.
  - Edificio Lapido built.
- 1935 – Asociación de Arte Constructivo founded.
- 1941 – City Hall of Montevideo built.
- 1945 – Cine Trocadero opens (approximate date).
- 1947 – Airport terminal inaugurated.
- 1952 – Cinemateca Uruguaya (film archive) founded.
- 1953 – Museo Torres García opens.
- 1956 – Cilindro Municipal (arena) opens.
- 1958 – Museum and Municipal Archives inaugurated in the Cabildo.
- 1963 – Population: 1,154,465.
- 1964 – Edificio Panamericano (residential building) constructed.
- 1973 – 27 June: 1973 Uruguayan coup d'état.
- 1975 – Population: 1,229,748.
- 1983 – September: Labor demonstration.
- 1985 – Liberty Building (Montevideo) built.
- 1988 – May: Pope John Paul II visits city.
- 1990
  - Tabaré Vázquez elected mayor.
  - City administration partially decentralized.
- 1991 – Population: 1,360,258.
- 1992 – Sarandi street pedestrianized.
- 1995 – 23 July: 1995 Copa América Final football tournament held.

== 21st century ==
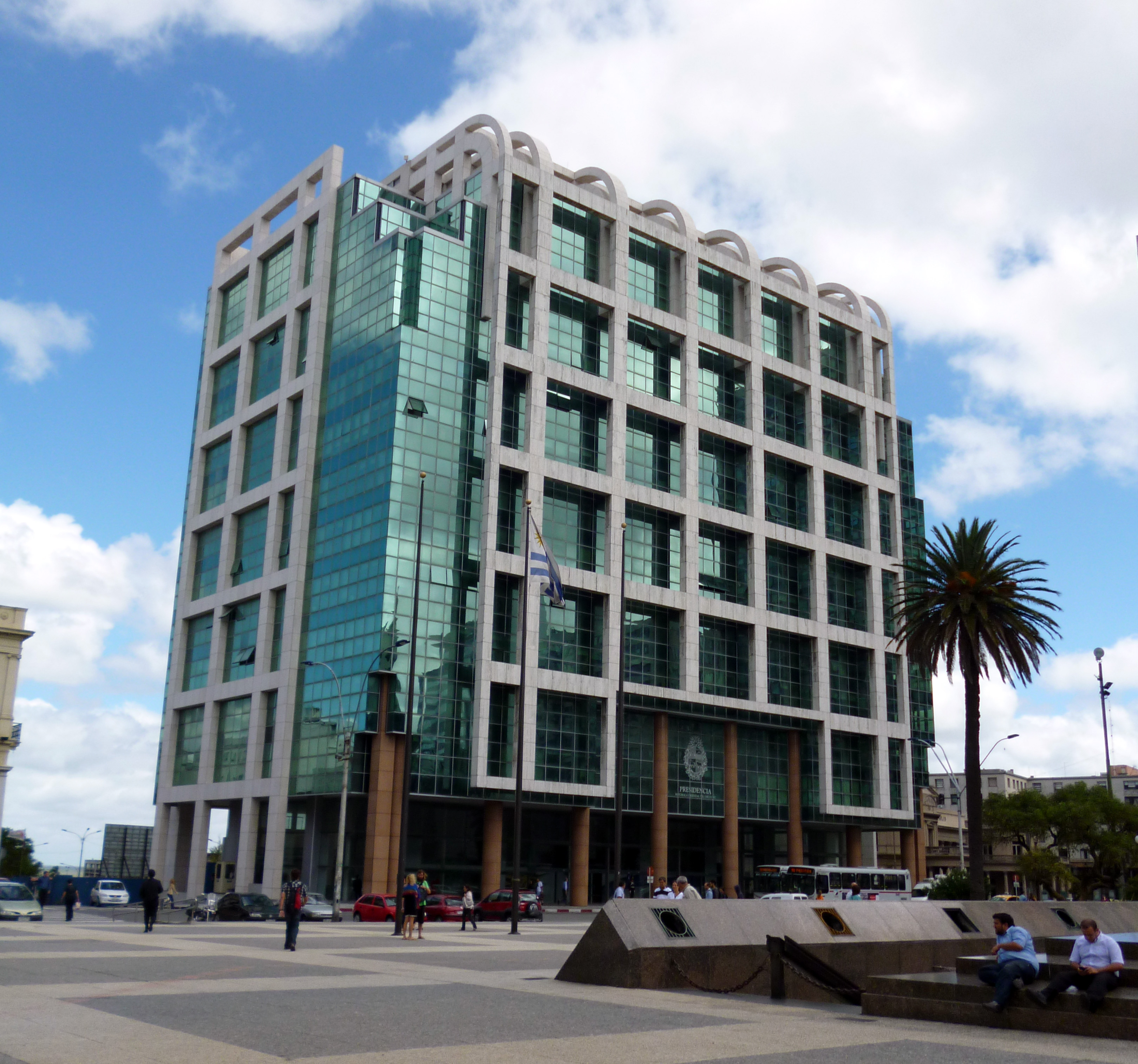
Executive Tower, Montevideo

- 2007 – Mercosur headquartered in city.
- 2008 – Executive Tower, Montevideo built.
- 2009 – Carrasco International Airport expands.
- 2010 – Ana Olivera becomes Intendant of Montevideo.
- 2011 – Population: 1,319,108.
- 2015 – Daniel Martínez becomes Intendant of Montevideo.
- 2016 – Population: 1,380,432.
- 2019 – Christian Di Candia becomes Intendant of Montevideo.
- 2020 – Carolina Cosse becomes Intendant of Montevideo.
- 2025 – Mario Bergara becomes Intendant of Montevideo.

== See also ==
- Montevideo history
- History of Montevideo
- Barrios of Montevideo
- List of municipal intendants of Montevideo
- List of governors of Montevideo, 1751–1817
- List of museums in Montevideo

== Bibliography ==
Published in the 19th century

- Emeric Essex Vidal (1820), Picturesque Illustrations of Buenos Ayres and Monte Video, London: R. Ackermann, OCLC 6287966, OL 6939031M
- Jedidiah Morse; Richard C. Morse (1823), "Monte Video, Buenos Ayres", A New Universal Gazetteer (4th ed.), New Haven: S. Converse
- David Brewster, ed. (1830). "Monte Video". Edinburgh Encyclopædia. Edinburgh: William Blackwood.
- John Hale Murray (1871), "(Monte Video)", Travels in Uruguay, London: Longmans & Co., OCLC 257407035
- "The Capital", The Republic of Uruguay, South America, London: E. Stanford, 1883, OCLC 9173138
- Michael George Mulhall; Edward T. Mulhall (1885), "Montevideo", Handbook of the River Plate, comprising the Argentine Republic, Uruguay and Paraguay (5th ed.), Buenos Aires: M.G. and E.T. Mulhall
- Theodore Child (May 1891). "Republic of Uruguay". Harper's New Monthly Magazine. 82. US: 917+.. Includes description of Montevideo.
- Archibald Wilberforce, ed. (1893). "Montevideo". Capitals of the Globe. New York: Peter Fenelon Collier. hdl:2027/mdp.39015061863513.
- Orestes Araújo (1900), "Montevideo", Diccionario geografico del Uruguay (in Spanish), Montevideo: Imprente Artística, de Dornaleche y Reyes, OCLC 1446163

Published in the 20th century

- "Montevideo, San Felipe y Santiago de" . Encyclopædia Britannica. Vol. 18 (11th ed.). 1910. pp. 778–779.
- Charles Warren Currier (1911), "Montevideo", Lands of the Southern Cross: a Visit to South America, Washington, DC: Spanish-American Publication Society
- W.H. Koebel (1911), "Montevideo", Uruguay, London: Unwin
- United States Bureau of Foreign and Domestic Commerce (1914), "Montevideo", Trade Directory of South America for the Promotion of American Export Trade, Washington, DC: Government Printing Office, OCLC 5821807
- Alberto B. Martínez (1914), "Montevideo", Baedeker of the Argentine Republic; including also parts of Brazil, the Republic of Uruguay, Chili and Bolivia, Barcelona: R. Sopena, printer
- Henry Stephens (1915), "Montevideo", South American Travels, New York: Knickerbocker Press, OCLC 6588111
- Annie Smith Peck (1916), "Montevideo", The South American Tour, New York: G.H. Doran, OCLC 4541554
- Gordon Ross (1917), "Mondevideo and Buenos Aires", Argentina and Uruguay, London: Methuen
- Guide book: Montevideo, Uruguay, U.S. Navy Ports of the World, Lansing, MI: Robert Smith Company, 1921, OL 25166657M
- Ernst B. Filsinger (1922), "Montevideo", Commercial Travelers' Guide to Latin America, Washington, DC: Govt. Print. Office
- Albes, Edward (1922). Montevideo, the city of roses. Pan American Union online; 29 pp well-illustrated
- Anton Rosenthal (1995a). "The Arrival of the Electric Streetcar and the Conflict over Progress in Early Twentieth-Century Montevideo". Journal of Latin American Studies. 27.
- Anton Rosenthal (1995b). "Streetcar Workers and the Transformation of Montevideo: The General Strike of May 1911". The Americas. 51.

Published in the 21st century

- Eduardo Canel (2001). "Municipal Decentralization and Participatory Democracy: Building a New Mode of Urban Politics in Montevideo City?". European Review of Latin American and Caribbean Studies (71).
- Susana Salgado (2003). The Teatro Solis: 150 Years of Opera, Concert and Ballet in Montevideo. Wesleyan University Press. ISBN 9780819565945.
- David Marley (2005), "Montevideo", Historic Cities of the Americas, Santa Barbara, CA: ABC-CLIO, p. 817+, ISBN 1-57607-027-1
