= Palacio Rinaldi =

Uruguay's building

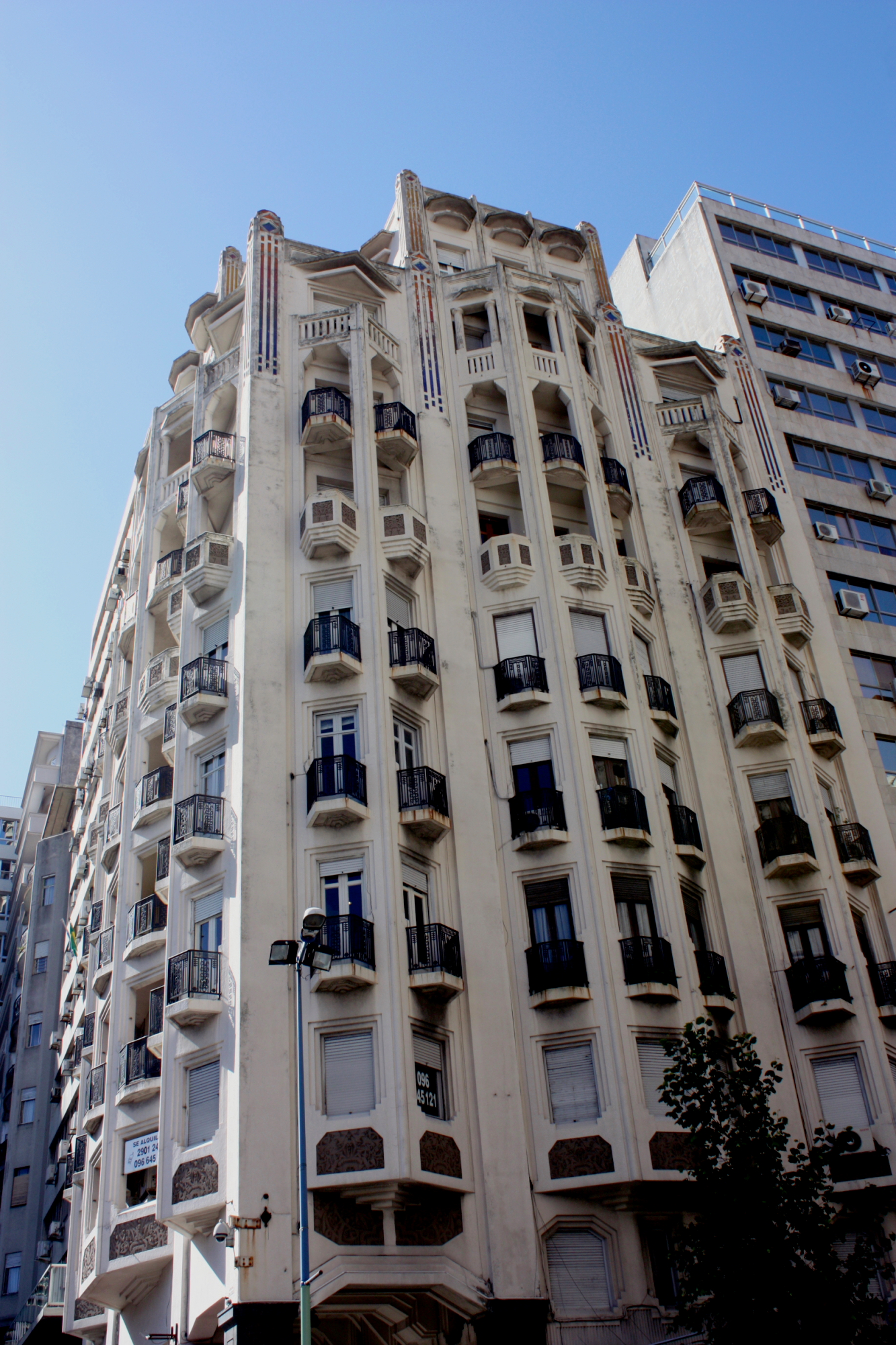
- Interactive map of the Palacio Rinaldi area

General information
- Type: Apartments
- Architectural style: Art Deco
- Location: 18 de Julio Avenue 839/841, Montevideo (Uruguay)
- Coordinates: 34°54′22″S 56°11′54″W
- Construction started: 1929

Technical details
- Floor count: 8

Design and construction
- Architects: Alberto Isola, Guillermo Armas

Palacio Rinaldi is a building in Centro, Montevideo, Uruguay, located on the Plaza Independencia near its junction with the 18 de Julio Avenue, near the Palacio Salvo.

It is a fine example of Art Deco architecture, built in 1929, by the architects Alberto Isola and Guillermo Armas.

It has been a Municipal Site of Interest since 1997.
