= Radisson Montevideo Victoria Plaza Hotel =

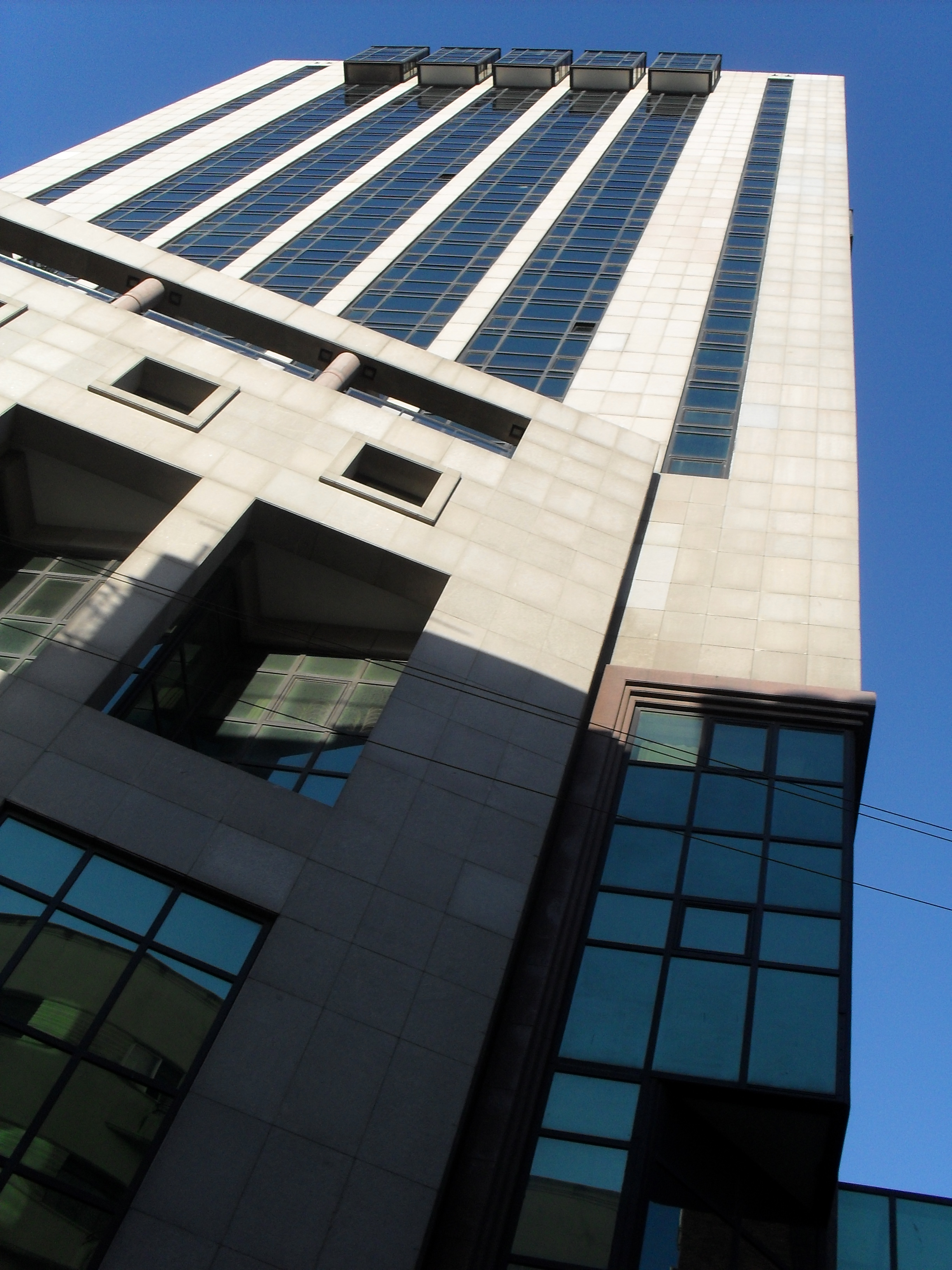
- Interactive map of the Radisson Montevideo Victoria Plaza Hotel area

General information
- Location: Plaza Independencia 759, Ciudad Vieja, Montevideo, Uruguay
- Coordinates: 34°54′19″S 56°12′0″W
- Opening: 1996; 30 years ago
- Management: Radisson Hotels

Technical details
- Floor count: 25

Other information
- Number of rooms: 232

Website
- www.radissonhotelsamericas.com/en-us/hotels/radisson-montevideo-victoria-plaza

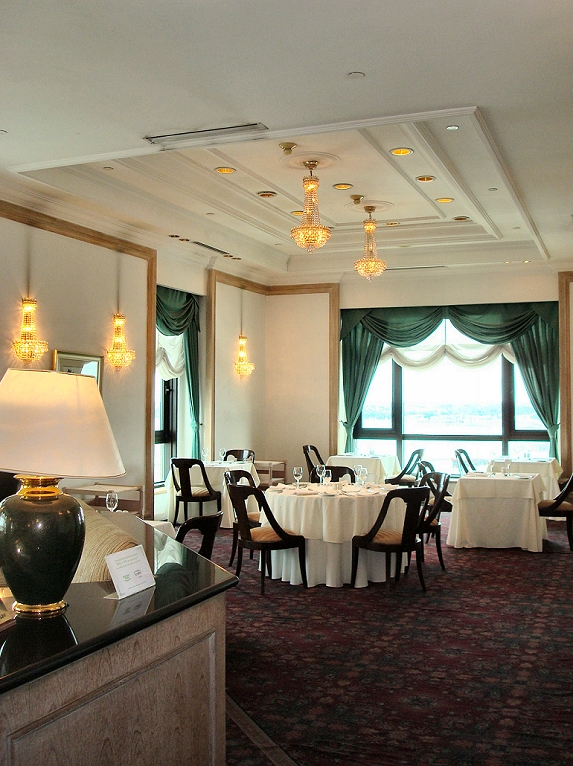
Restaurante Arcadia

Radisson Montevideo Victoria Plaza Hotel is a hotel on the central Plaza Independencia in the Old City of Montevideo, Uruguay, operated by Radisson Hotels. The Radisson Montevideo has 232 rooms, contains a casino and is served by the Restaurante Arcadia on the 25th floor. At 115 meters, it is on the list of tallest buildings in Uruguay.
