= List of museums in Montevideo =

This is a list of museums and art galleries in Montevideo, Uruguay.

== Biographical, City, Ethnographic, and History museums, and Historic Houses ==
- Archivo de la Ciudad
- Museo del Arma de Ingenieros “Aduana de Oribe”
- Museo y Archivo Histórico Municipal - Cabildo
- Casa de Gobierno “Palacio Estevez”
- Museo Histórico Nacional
  - Casa del Gral. Fructuoso Rivera
  - Casa del Gral. Juan Antonio Lavalleja
  - Casa de Antonio Montero (see Museo Romántico)
  - Casa de Juan Francisco Giró
  - Casa de José Garibaldi
  - Casa de Manuel Ximénez y Gómez
  - Casa Quinta del Dr. Luis Alberto de Herrera
  - Casa Quinta de José Batlle y Ordoñez
  - Casa de Juan Zorrilla de San Martín (see Museo Juan Zorrilla de San Martín)
- Museo de Artes Decorativas (Palacio Taranco)
- Museo de las Telecomunicaciones
- Museo Juan Zorrilla de San Martín (House museum and art gallery)
- Museo Romántico (Casa de Antonio Montero)
- Museo del Descubrimiento-Apostadero Naval Español
- Centro Cultural y Museo de la Memoria
- Recordatorio del Holocausto

== Folklore, Folk art ==
- Museo del Carnaval
- Museo del Gaucho

== Art, Culture, Music, and Photography museums ==
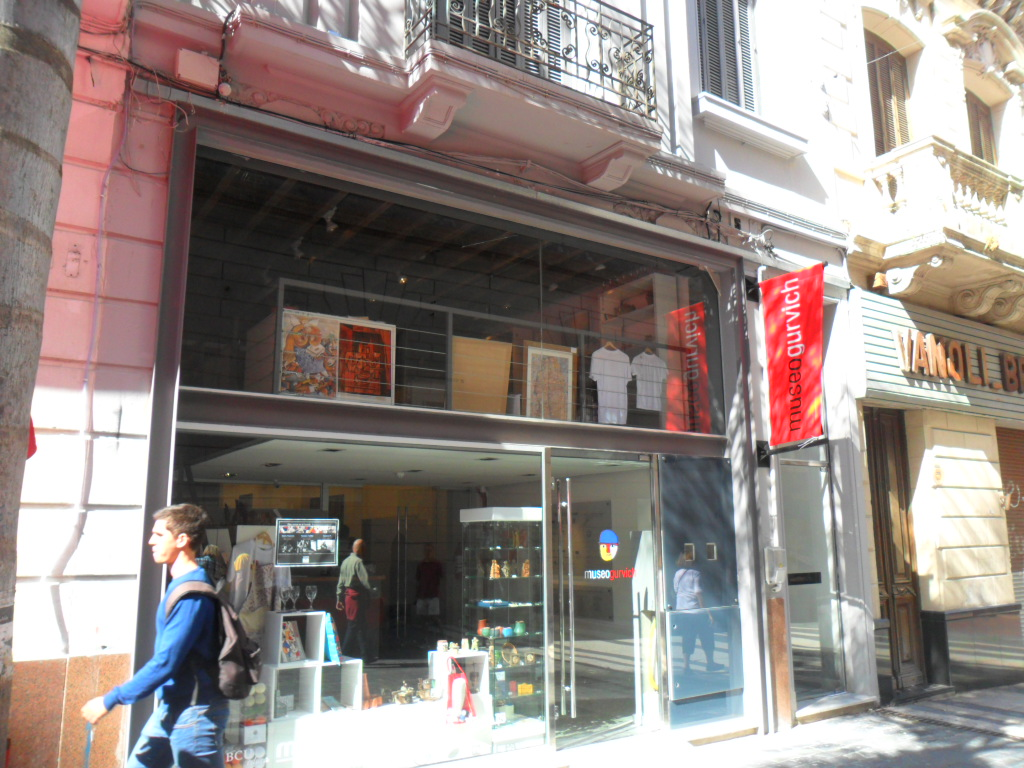
Façade of Museo Gurvich

- Centro de Fotografía de Montevideo
- Museo de Arte Contemporáneo
- Museo de Historia del Arte y de Arte Precolombino y Colonial (MuHAr)
- Museo de Arte Precolombino e Indígena (Mapi)
- Museo Nacional de Artes Visuales
- Museo Juan Manuel Blanes
- Museo del Azulejo
- Museo Egipcio
- Museo Figari
- Museo Gurvich
- Museo Joaquín Torres García
- Museo Virtual de Artes El País
- Carnival Museum
- Vilamajó House Museum

=== Art Galleries and exhibition rooms ===
- Espacio de Arte Contemporáneo
- Sala de Arte "Carlos Federico Sáez"
- Centro Cultural AGADU
- Centro Cultural España
- Centro de Fotografía de Montevideo (CdF)
- Centro Municipal de Exposiciones "Subte"
- Sala Zitarrosa
- Museo de las Migraciones

== Industry, Maritime, Military, Railway, Science, Technology, Transport ==
- Museo Aeronáutico
- Museo del Automóvil Eduardo Iglesias
- Museo "Blandengues de Artigas"
- Museo Estación Peñarol
- Museo y Parque Fernando García
- Museo Militar Fortaleza General Artigas
- Museo Naval de Montevideo
- Museo Viviente de la Radio y las Comunicaciones
- Planetrium of Montevideo

== Anthropology, Natural History, Geology, Paleontology ==
- Museo de Geología del Uruguay
- Museo Nacional de Historia Natural
- Museo Nacional de Antropología
- Museo Marítimo Ecológico de Malvín
- Museo Zoológico Dámaso Antonio Larrañaga

== Children, Education, Special Interests, Sports, University ==
- Museo del Fútbol del Uruguay (Centenario stadium)
- Museo Pedagógico "José Pedro Varela"
- Museo de la Moneda del Banco República
- Numismatic Museum
