= List of city squares and parks in Montevideo =

The following is a list of city squares and parks in Montevideo:

== Squares ==
- Plaza de la Democracia (Tres Cruces)
- Plaza de Cagancha, or Plaza Libertad (Centro)
- Plaza de la Constitición, or Plaza Matríz (Ciudad Vieja)
- Plaza España (Ciudad Vieja)
- Plaza Fabini, or Plaza del Entrevero (Centro)
- Plaza Independencia (Ciudad Vieja)
- Plaza Isabel la Católica (Centro)
- Plaza Tomás Gomensoro (Pocitos)
- Plaza de los Treinta y Tres Orientales, or Plaza Artola (Cordón)
- Plaza Zabala (Ciudad Vieja)

== Squares that are also parks ==
- Plaza or Parque Liber Seregni (Cordón)
- Plaza de la Armada or Plaza Virgilio (Punta Gorda)

== Parks ==
- Parque Batlle (Parque Batlle)
- Parque Capurro (Capurro)
- Parque Lineal Arquitecto Eugenio Baroffio (Punta Gorda)
- Parque Fernando Garcia (Bañados de Carrasco)
- Parque General Lavalleja (Carrasco)
- Parque Lecocq (Los Bulevares / Santiago Vasquez)
- Parque Prado (Prado)
- Parque Fructuoso Rivera (Punta Gorda)
- Parque Rodó (Punta Carretas)
- Parque Dr. Juan Zorrilla de San Martin (Punta Carretas)
- Parque Dr. Carlos Vaz Ferreira (Casabo)
