= Palacio Barolo =

Coordinates: 34°36′34.4″S 58°23′9.1″W

Barolo Palace
- Palacio Barolo

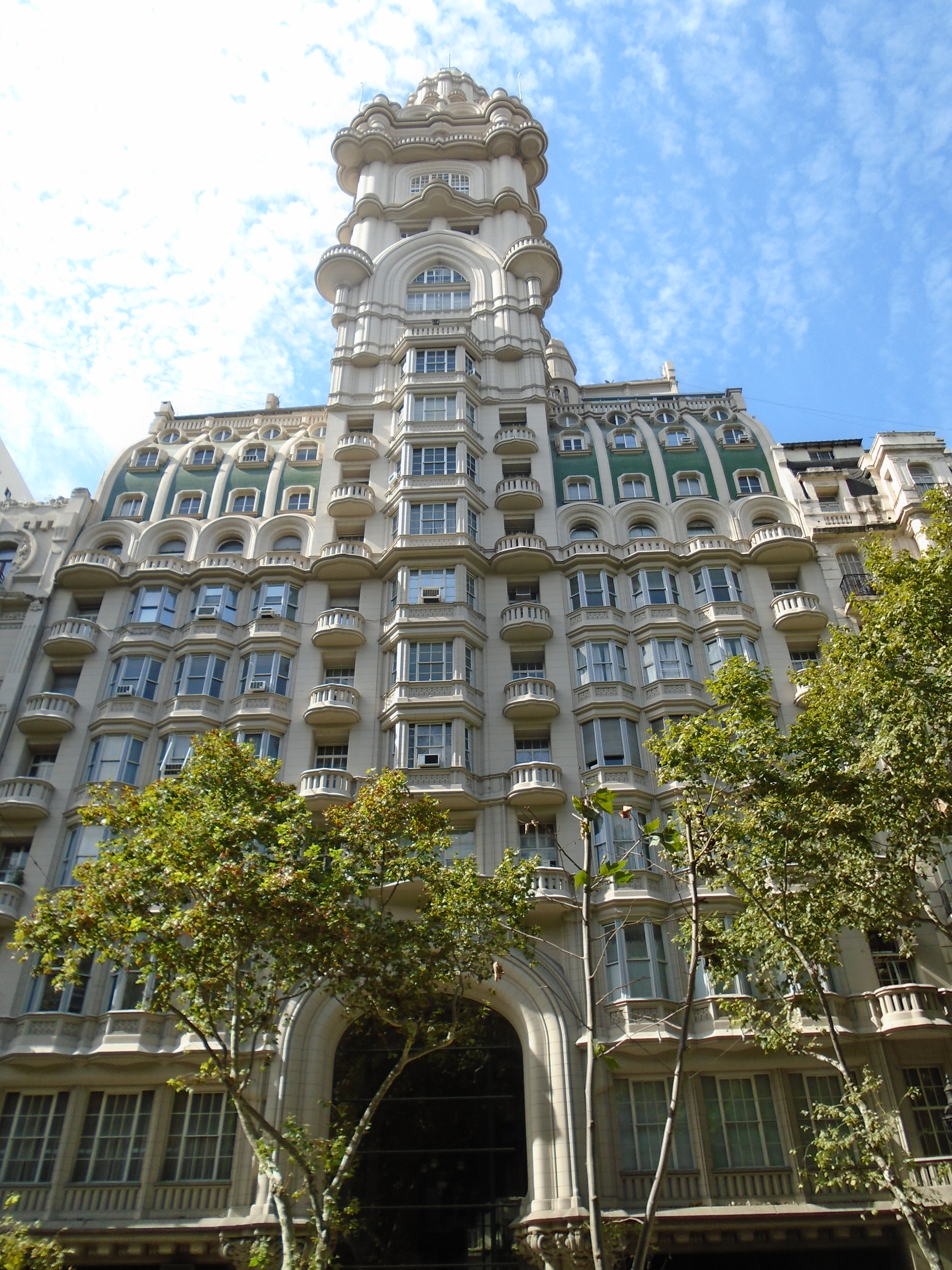
- The building in 2018
- Interactive map of the Barolo Palace area

General information
- Type: Office building
- Architectural style: Art Nouveau, Art Deco, Eclecticism, Gothic
- Location: Buenos Aires, Argentina, Avenida de Mayo 1370
- Construction started: 1919
- Opened: July 7, 1923; 103 years ago

Height
- Height: 100 metres

Technical details
- Floor count: 22

Design and construction
- Architect: Mario Palanti
- Main contractor: Wayss & Freytag

Website
- palaciobarolo.com.ar

National Historic Monument of Argentina
- Designated: 1989

Palacio Barolo is a landmark office building, located at 1370 Avenida de Mayo, in the neighborhood of Monserrat, Buenos Aires, Argentina. It stood as Buenos Aires' tallest building for more than a decade until the construction of the Kavanagh Building in 1936. Its twin brother, Palacio Salvo, is a building designed and erected in Eclectic style, built by the same architect in Montevideo.

This building was declared a national historic monument in 1997. Currently, the building has several travel agencies, a Spanish school for foreigners, a store that sells clothes for tango, offices and studios of architects, accountants, lawyers, and designers.

== History ==
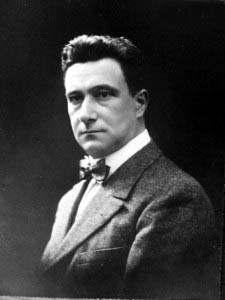
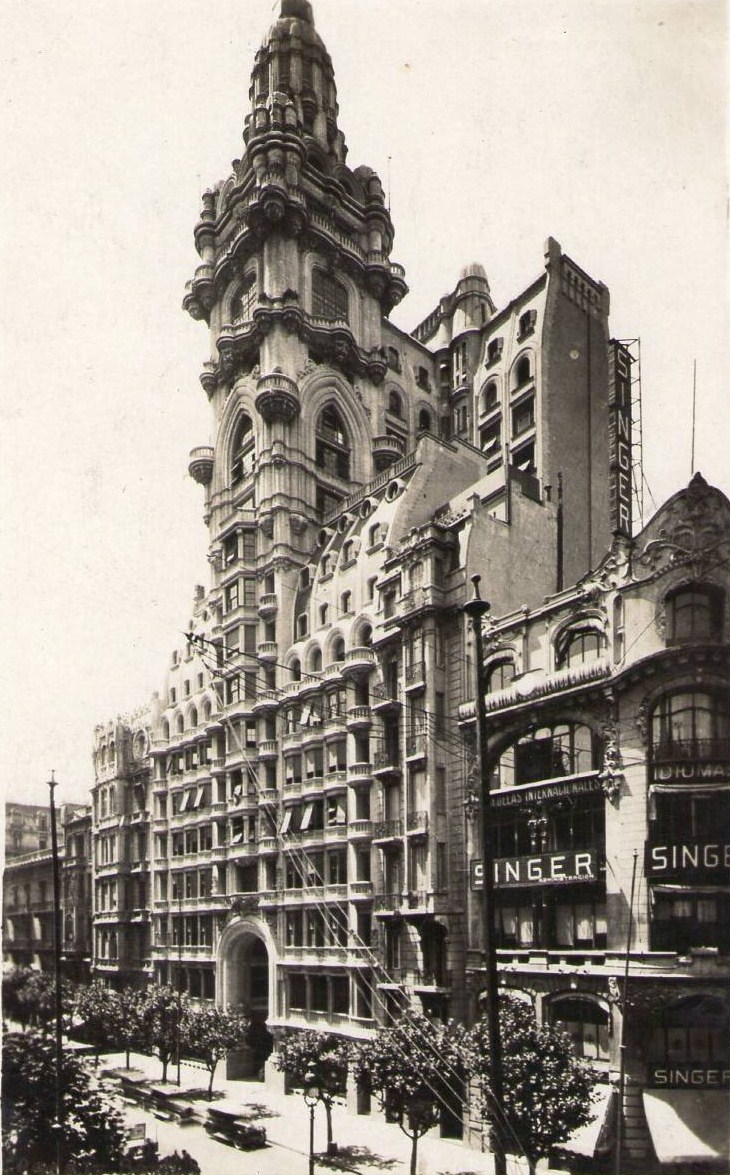
Luis Barolo (left); (right): view of the building c. 1925

Italian architect Mario Palanti was commissioned to design the building by entrepreneur Luis Barolo, an Italian immigrant who had arrived in Argentina in 1890 and had made a fortune in knitted fabrics. The basic design, in eclectic style, was conceived simultaneously with one for the Palacio Salvo in Montevideo, Uruguay.

The Palacio Barolo was designed in accordance with the cosmology of Dante's Divine Comedy, motivated by the architect's admiration for Alighieri. There are 22 floors, divided into three "sections". The basement and ground floor represent hell, floors 1-14 are purgatory, and 15-22 represent heaven. The building is 100 meters (330 feet) tall, one metre for each canto of the Divine Comedy. The lighthouse at the top of the building can be seen all the way in Montevideo, Uruguay. The owner planned to use only 3 floors, and to rent the rest.

When completed in 1923, it was the tallest building, not only in the city, but also in the whole of South America. It remained the city's tallest building until 1935 when, on completion, the Kavanagh Building acquired this distinction. Today it houses mainly lawyers' offices, a Spanish-language school, and a store that sells Tango clothing.

== Technical details ==
The steel-structured skyscraper measures 100 metres and has 22 floors; each floor has a unique design and ornamentation. Staying with the Divine Comedy (in addition to the meter for each canto), the lighted beacon at the top of the building represents the nine choirs of angels. The structure is topped by a small spire with an ornament depicting the Southern Cross constellation. The building is listed in the Emporis database.

The building's foundations conform to the golden ratio. The skyscraper was constructed to house Dante's ashes; Barolo believed "that Europe had begun drifting toward collapse" and wanted to house them as far away as possible from the Continent.

The lobby features a central hall adorned with inscriptions in Latin verse and monster statues. It radiates out from a central dome into nine vaulted archways; these represent the nine circles of hell as described in the Inferno. The first three floors have geometric figures representing the alchemical symbols for fire, the colours of the Italian flag, and various Masonic symbols on the walls and floors. The lobby also has operational antiquated elevators.

The lighthouse on the top of the building along with the Palacio Salvo in Montevideo, Uruguay, were designed to serve as a welcome to visitors arriving from the Atlantic Ocean to the Rio de la Plata estuary, similar to the Pillars of Hercules. The ornamental spire aligns with the actual Southern Cross constellation on 9 July, Argentine Independence Day.

== Gallery ==
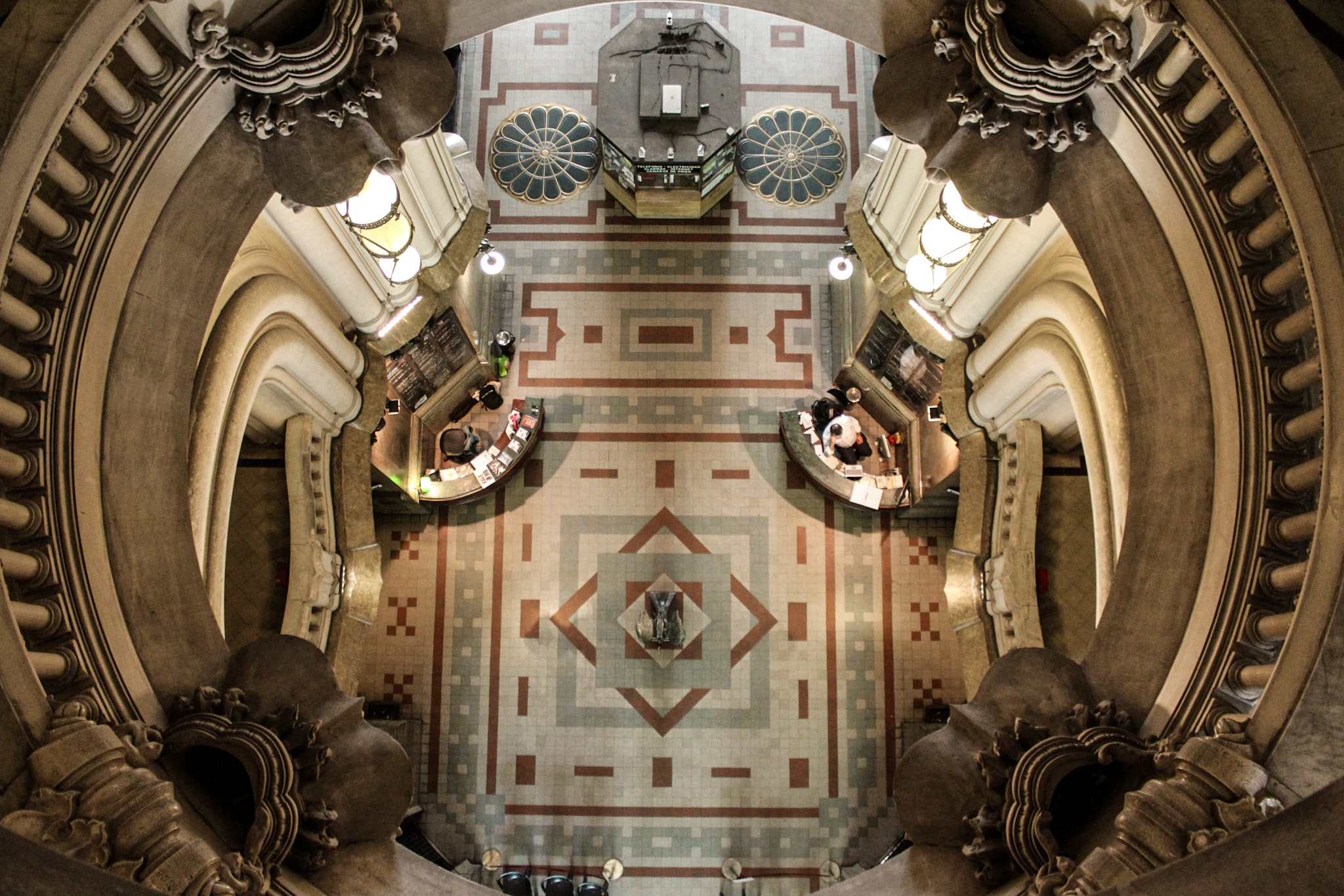

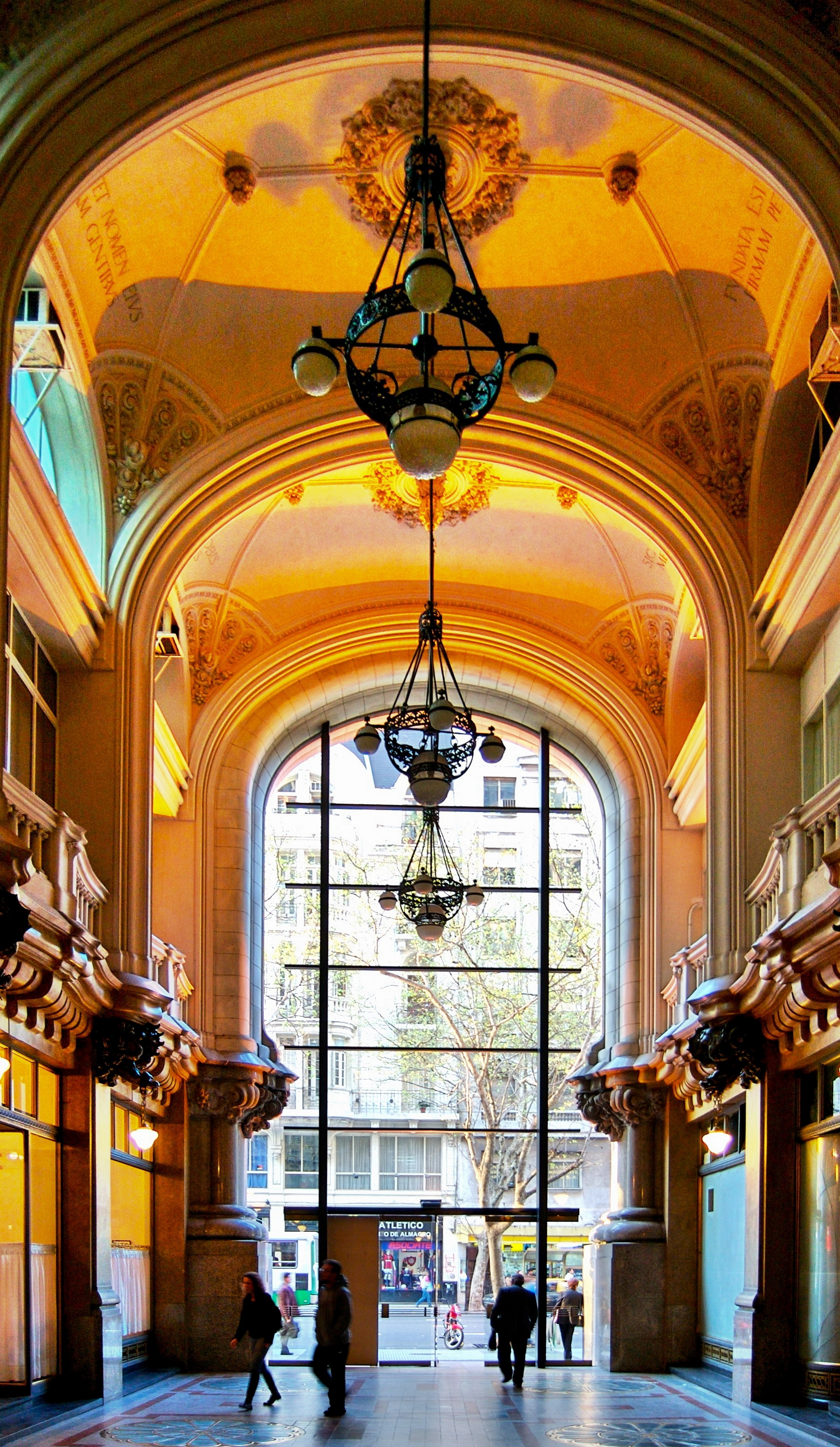

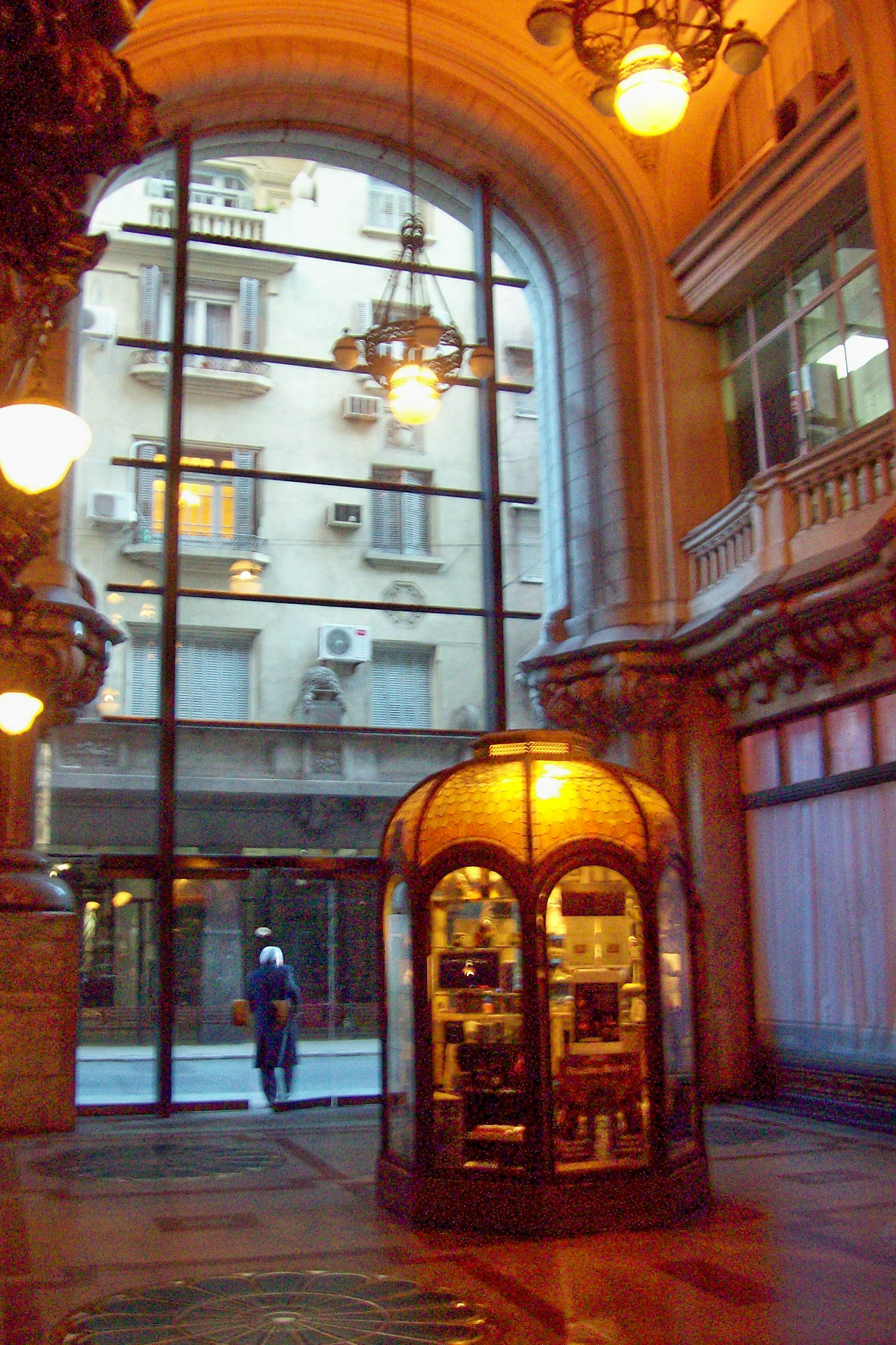

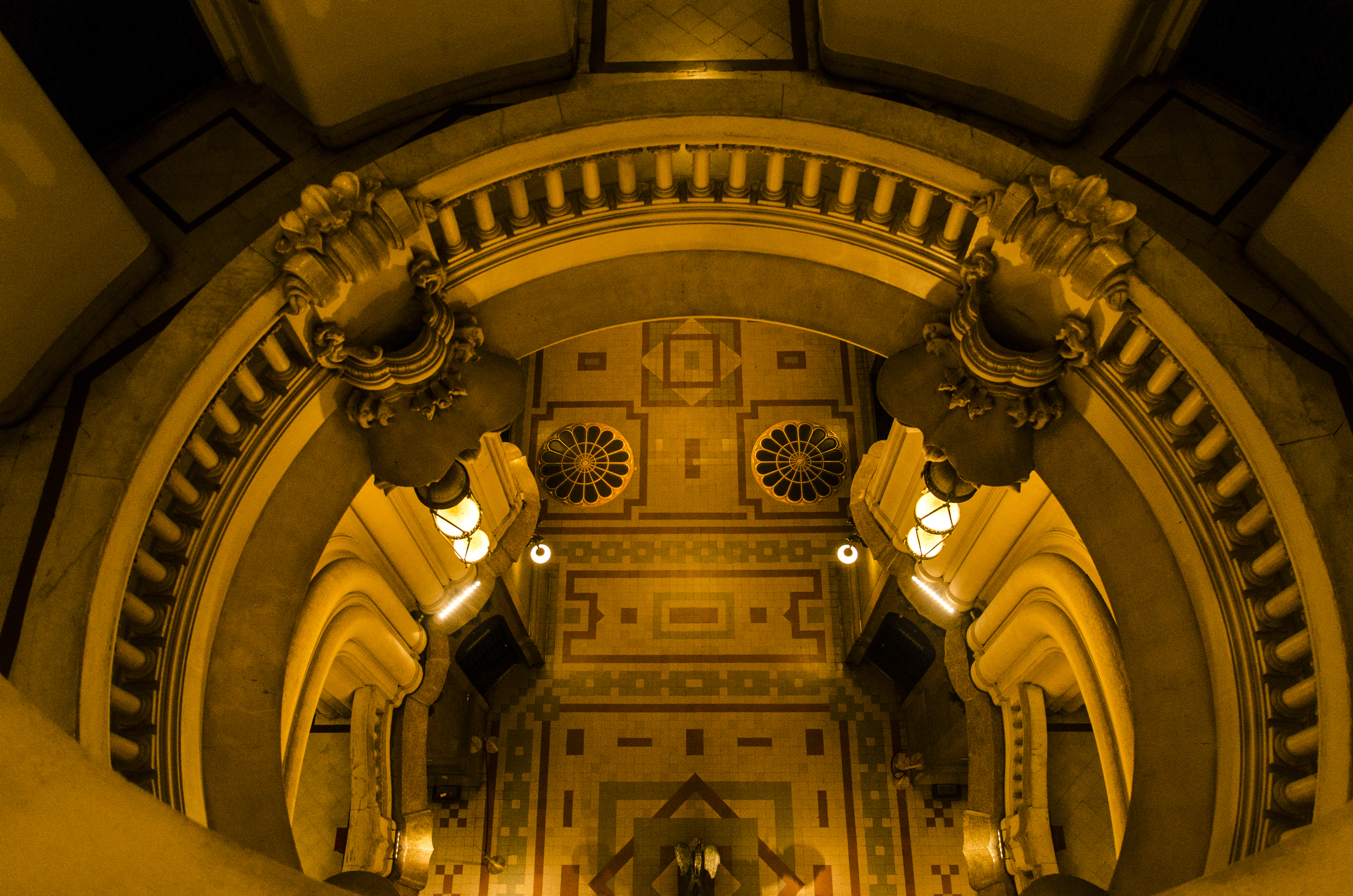

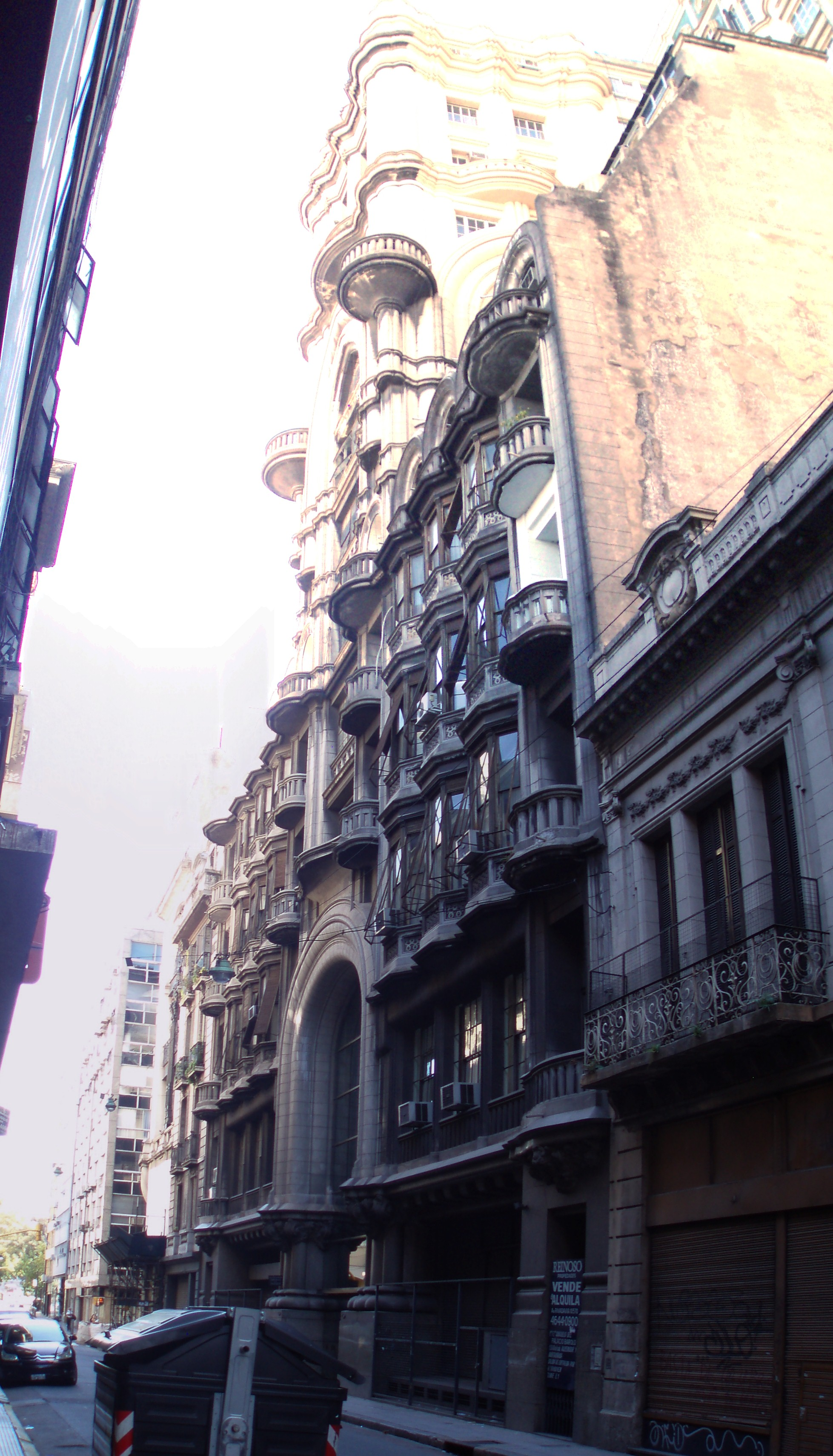

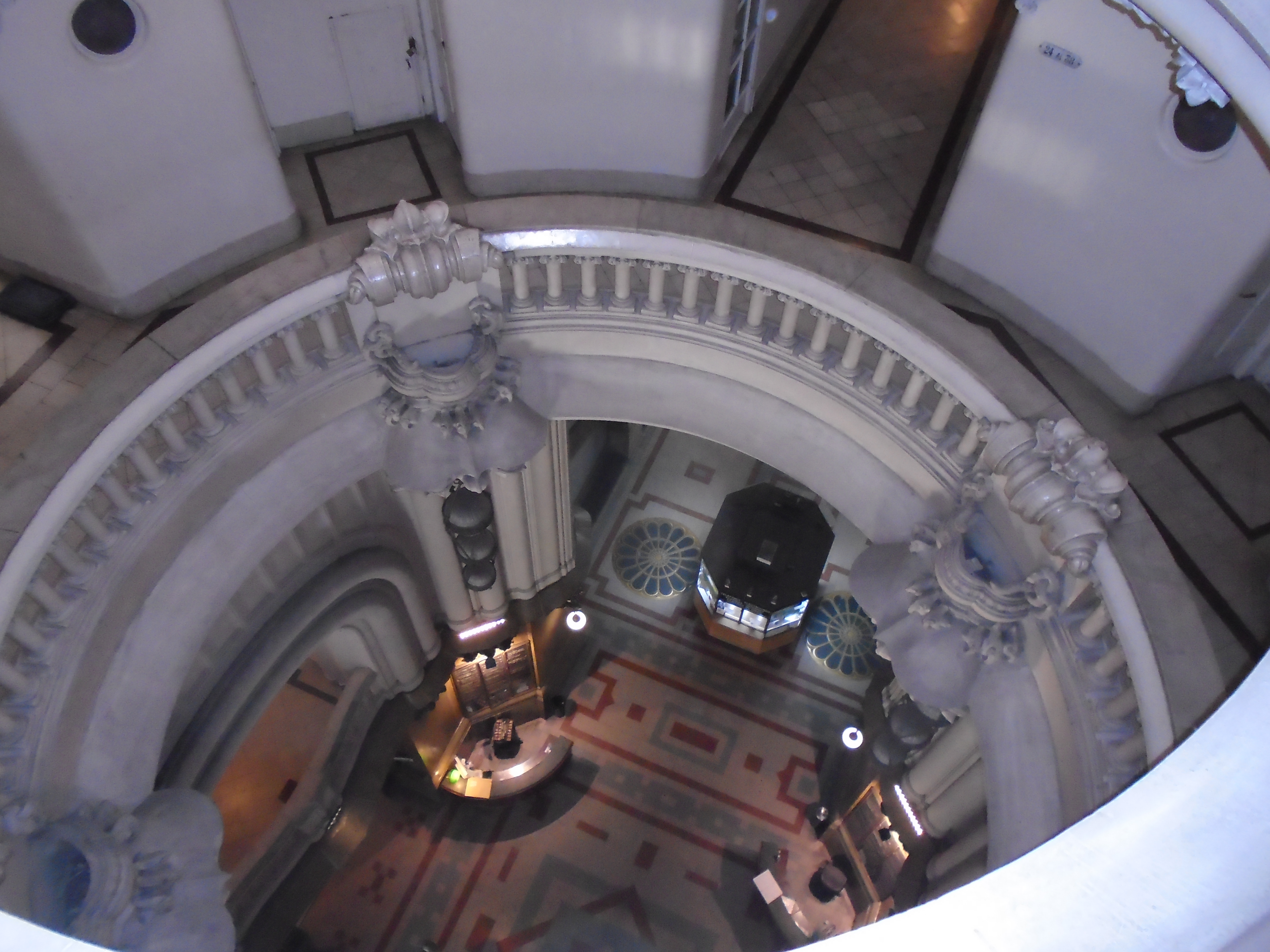

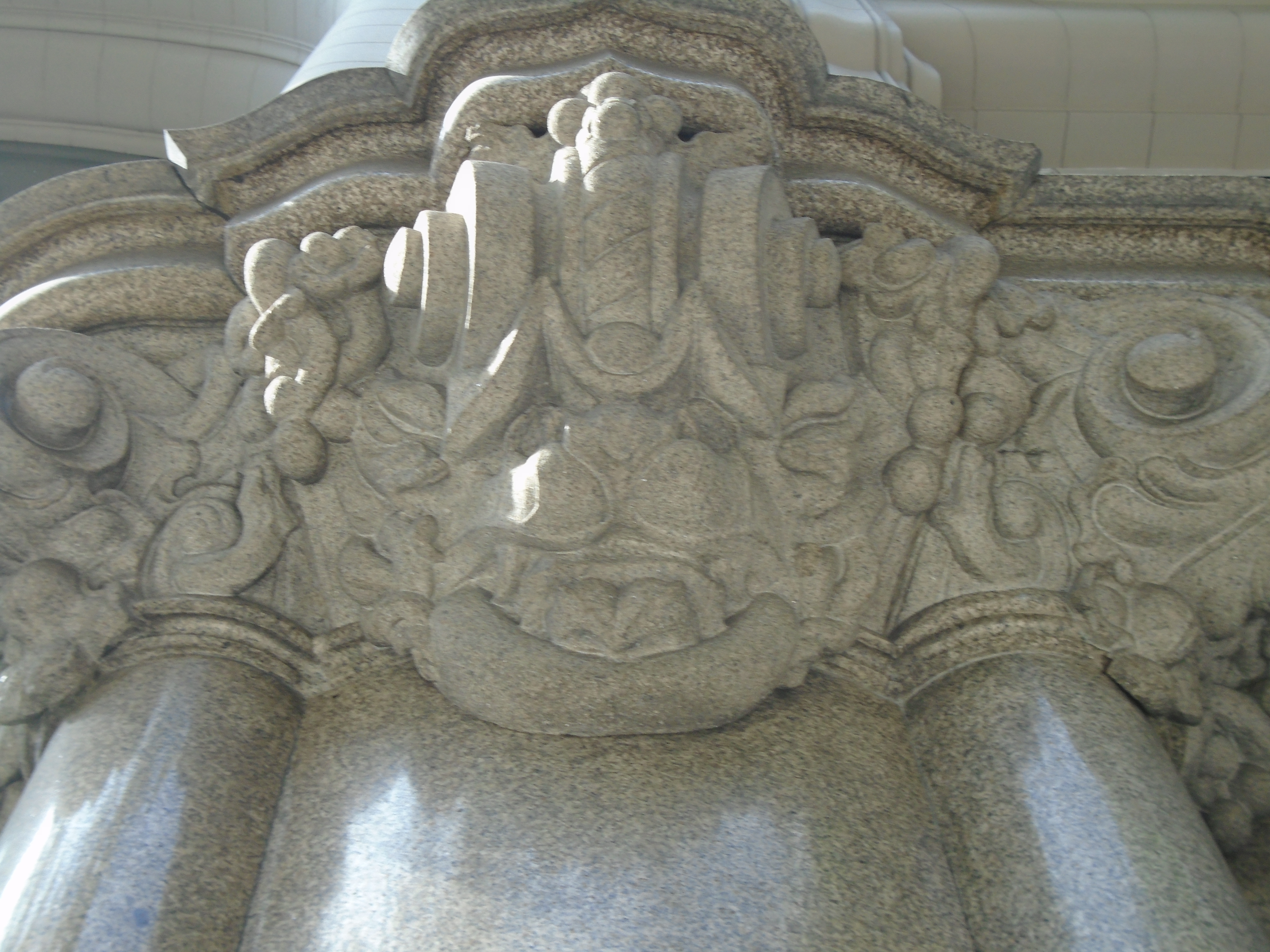

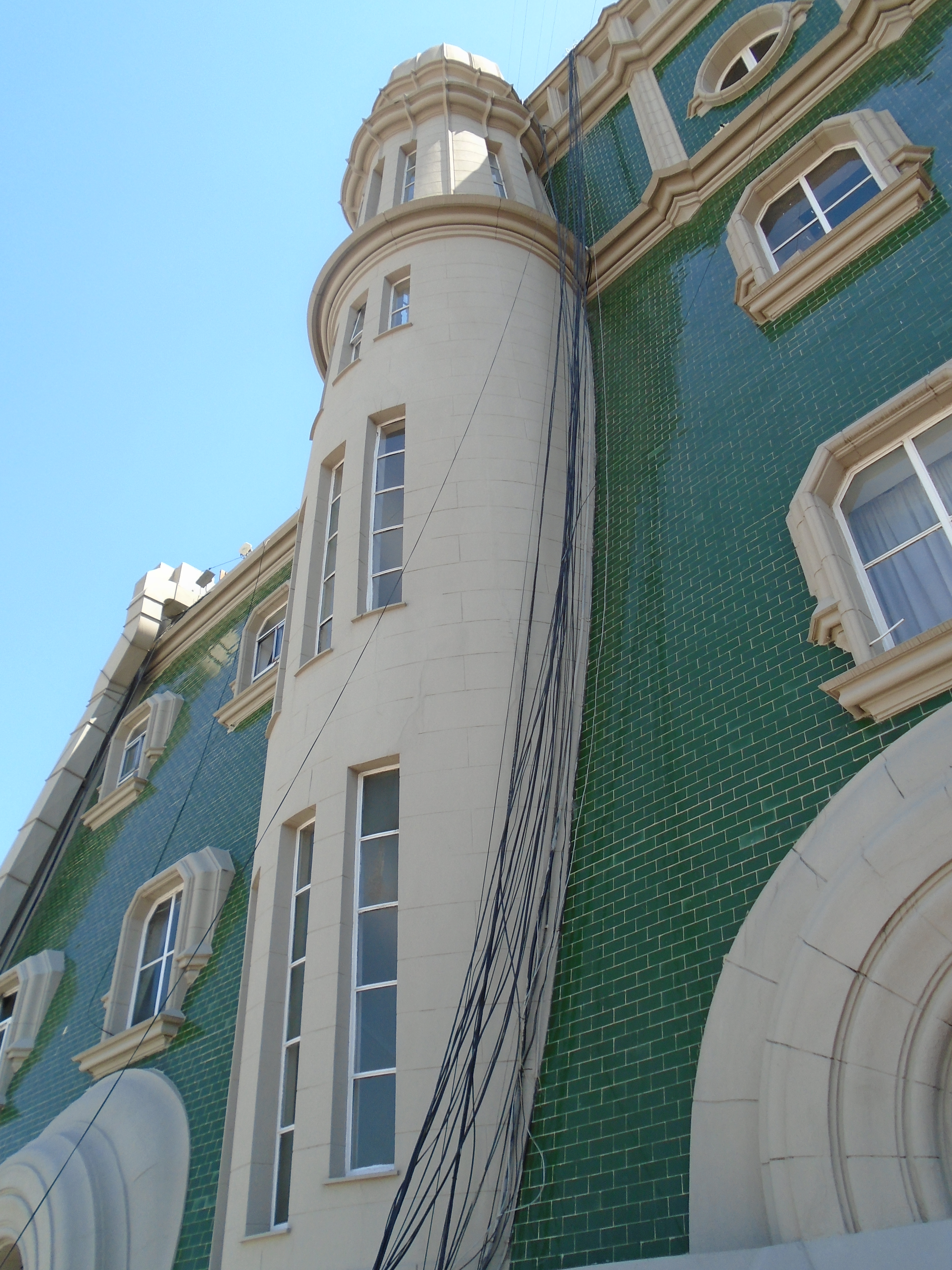

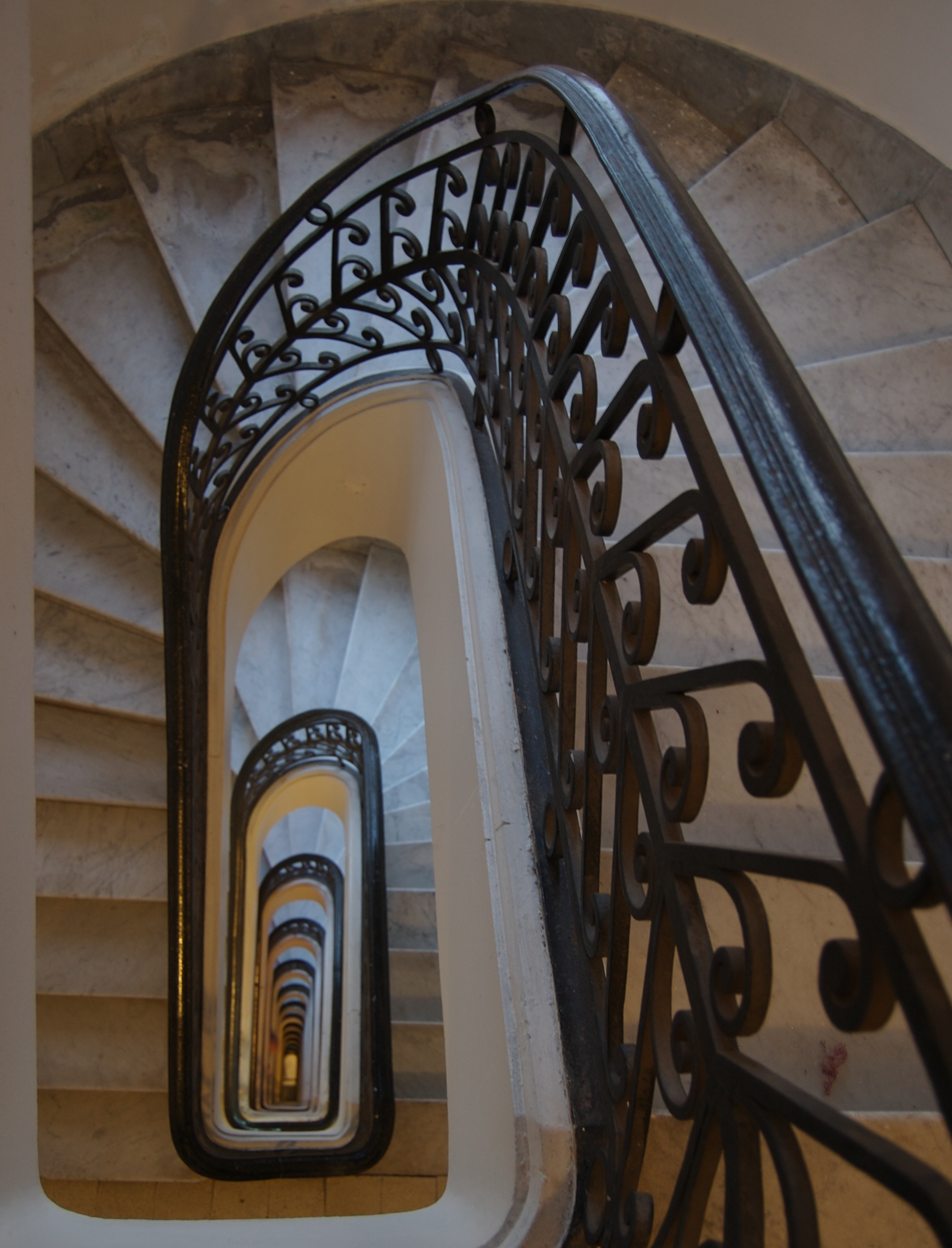

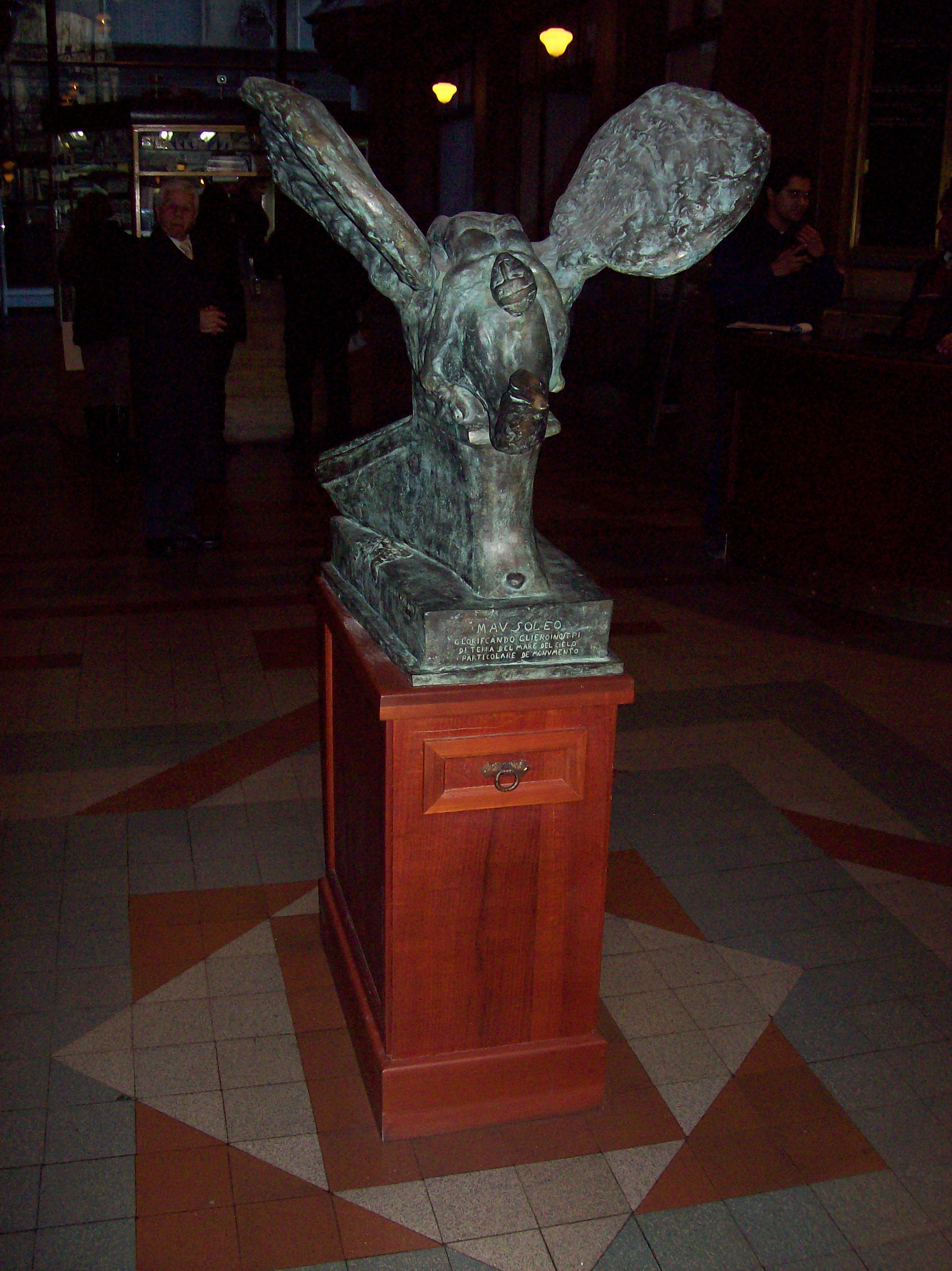

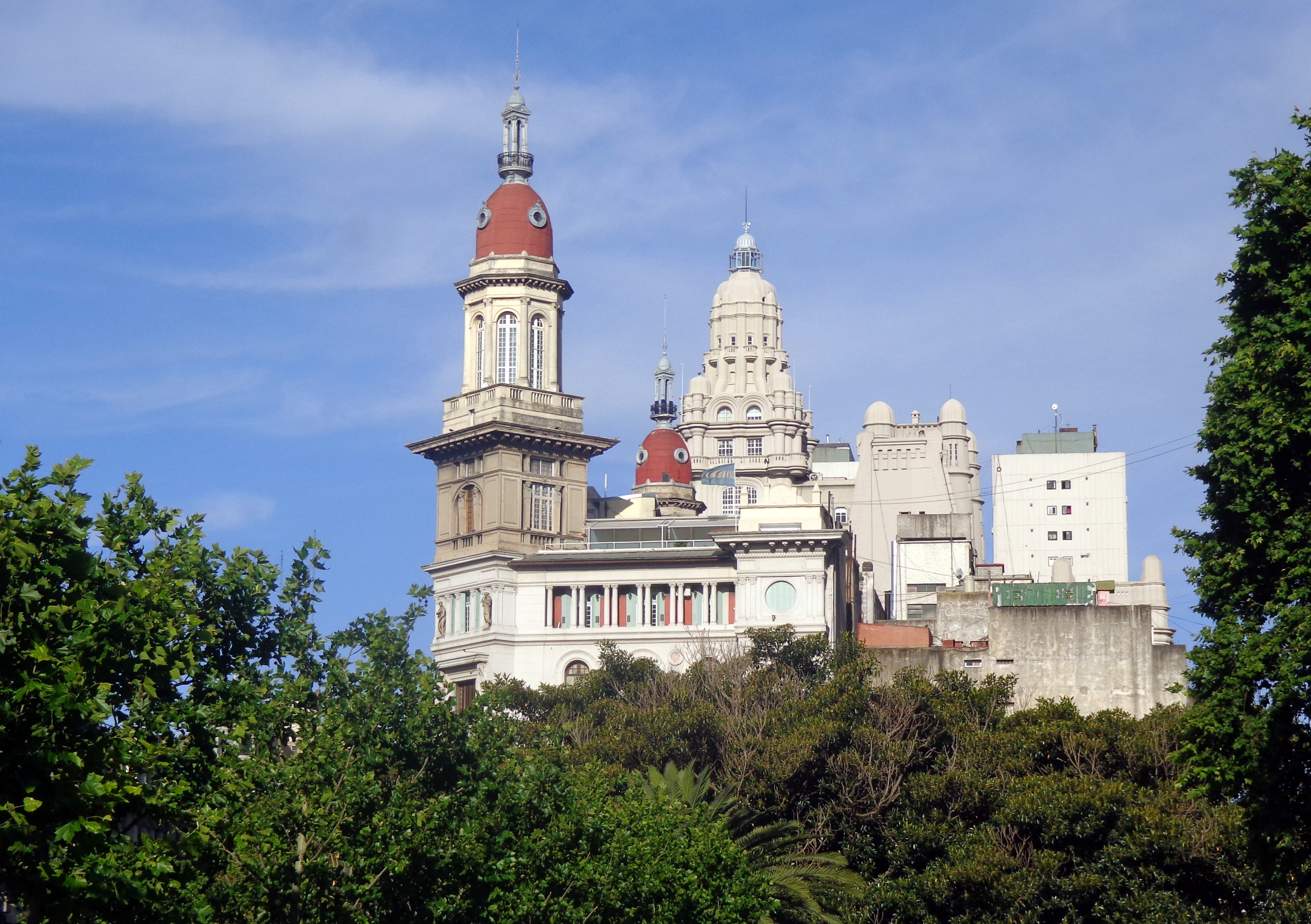

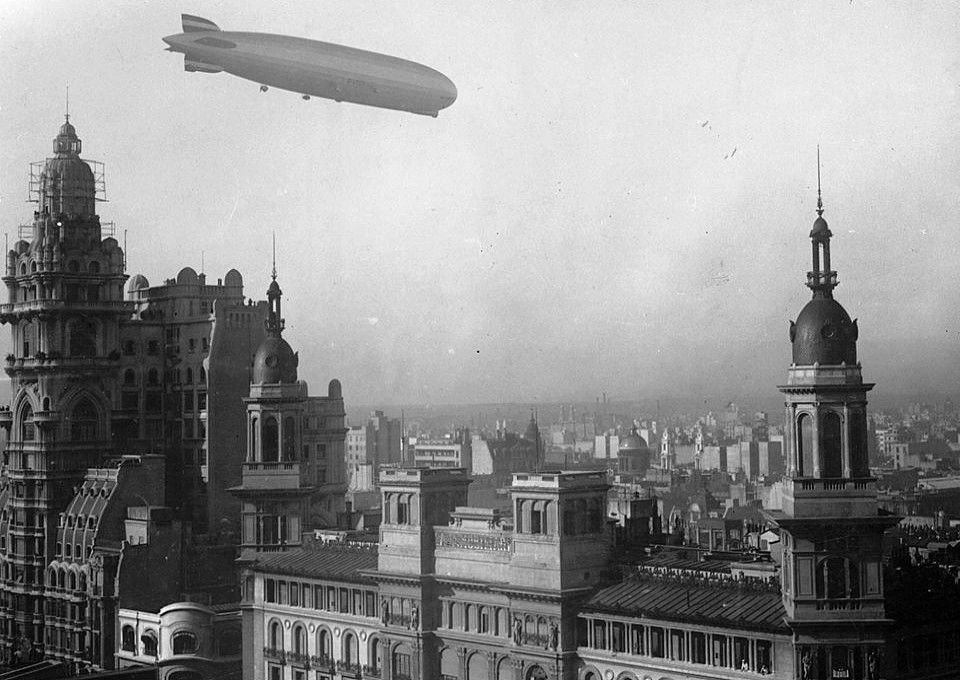
The Graf Zeppelin flying over the building in 1934
