= Palacio Salvo =

Salvo Palace
- Palacio Salvo (Spanish)
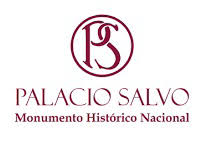

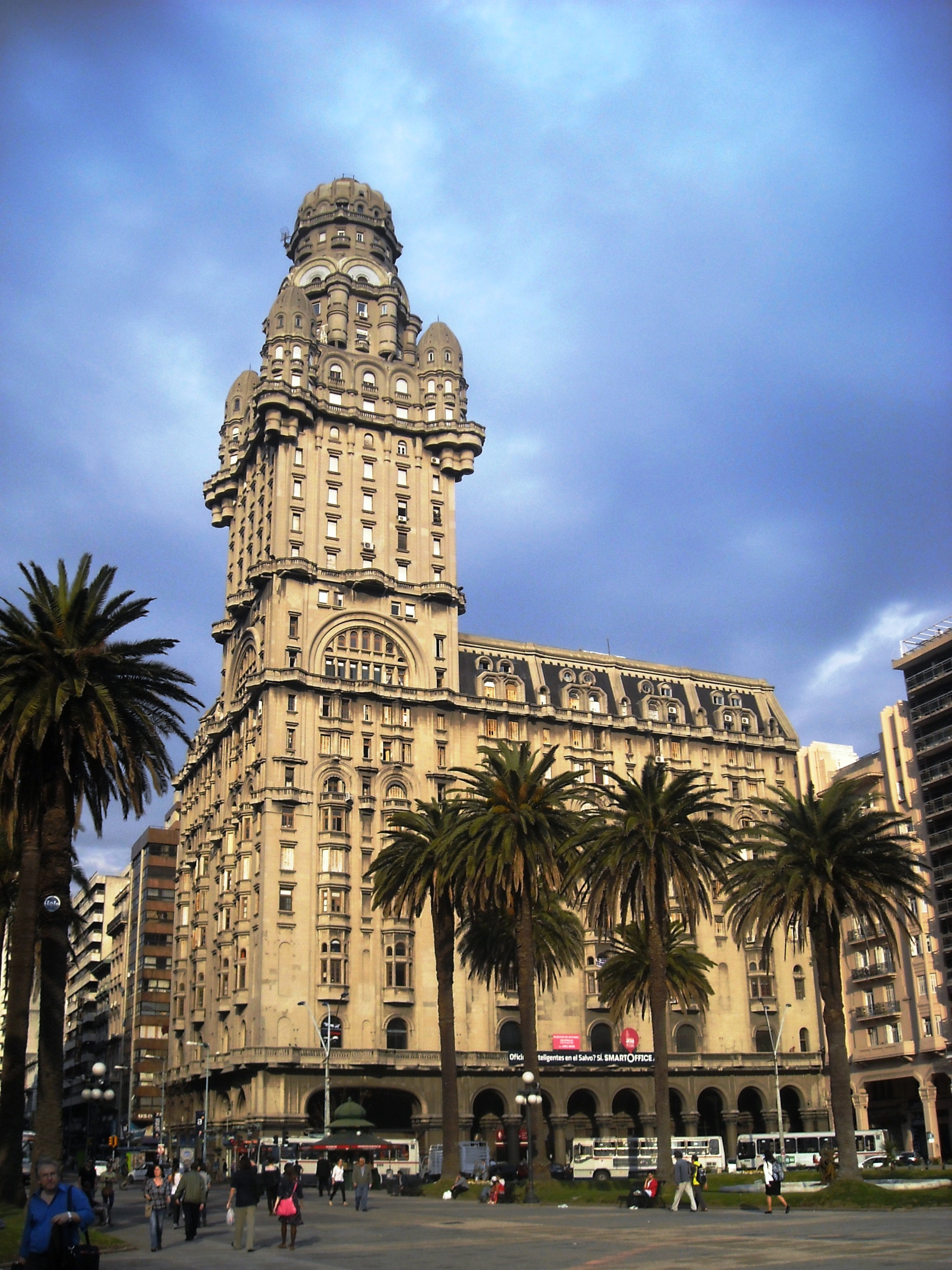
- Seen from Plaza Independencia
- Interactive map of the Salvo Palace area

General information
- Type: Offices and apartments
- Architectural style: Eclectic
- Location: Plaza Independencia, Montevideo, Uruguay
- Coordinates: 34°54′24.21″S 56°11′53.91″W
- Construction started: 1925
- Completed: 1928
- Opening: Daily tours. 10.30 to 13.30 hrs.
- Owner: Palacio Salvo S.A. (Condominium)

Height
- Architectural: 101 m (331 ft)
- Tip: 105 m (344 ft)

Technical details
- Floor count: 27 (+ 2 basement floors)

Design and construction
- Architect: Mario Palanti
- Developer: Salvo Brothers
- Structural engineer: Lorenzo Gori Salvo

References
- http://www.salvosuites.com

The Palacio Salvo (English: Salvo Palace) is an eclectic skyscraper at the intersection of 18 de Julio Avenue and Plaza Independencia in the Centro neighbourhood of Montevideo, Uruguay. Finished in 1928, It was built thanks to the initiative of the business brothers Ángel, José and Lorenzo Salvo, the 27-story Palacio Salvo stands 105 m (344 ft) high. It was the tallest building in Latin America for a brief period, at its completion it was the tallest reinforced concrete structure in the world. It was designed by the architect Mario Palanti, an Italian immigrant living in Buenos Aires, who used a similar design for his Palacio Barolo in Buenos Aires, Argentina.

Since 1996 it is a National Historical Monument of Uruguay.

== Site ==
The plot was bought by the Salvo brothers for 650,000 Uruguayan pesos. It was the location of popular pastry shop La Giralda, a place renowned for being where Gerardo Matos Rodríguez first played his famous tango La Cumparsita in 1917, now a cultural symbol of Uruguay. Nowadays, Palacio Salvo holds the Tango Museum with an exhibition on the history of La Cumparsita and Uruguayan Tango.

== The building ==
The building was originally intended to be a hotel, but this plan did not work out, and it has since been occupied by a mixture of offices and private residences. The building has a height of 101 m (331 ft) and with the beacon on top in reaches 105 m (344 ft).

In the basement, now occupied by a parking garage, there was once a theater where Joséphine Baker, the Lecuona Cuban Boys, and Jorge Negrete, among many others, performed. It is one of Montevideo’s main tourist attractions.

== Architecture ==
With an eclectic style that combines Renaissance references with Gothic reminiscences and Neoclassical touches, its distinctive silhouette has become an emblem of the city and a reminder of the prosperous years of the early 20th century.

The building consists of a basement, ground floor, mezzanine, ten full upper floors, and fourteen tower floors, housing 370 residential units. It was originally built as an office building, with a section designated for a hotel and the ground floor reserved for commercial spaces, featuring an open passageway connecting Plaza Independencia with Andes Street (since 2024, renamed José Germán Araújo Street).

Today, the ground floor hosts commercial establishments, while the upper floors are dedicated to residences and offices. Many ornamental elements located at the corners were removed in 1979 due to repeated detachments falling onto public areas. On July 13, 2017, the original gates in the passage connecting Plaza Independencia with Andes Street were reinstalled. This is part of a broader restoration plan for the building, which since 2021 includes facade repairs and the restoration of the grand stained-glass window.

=== The Salvo's Light ===
The original specifications and blueprints describe a lighthouse at the top of the building, it is not known when or why in was removed but it was replaced by a large TV antenna; the antenna was permanently removed in November 2012. The specifications stated “on the top part of the tower a lighthouse will be placed made by Salmoiraghi of Italy, with a parabolic mirror of 920 mm (36 in), reaching approximately 100 km (62 mi), and a rotating 100 amp lamp.”

On April 28, 2017, five years after the antenna removal a LED beacon was inaugurated atop the building’s dome. This intervention, called 'Gran Salvo' aims to restore the splendor that made this landmark stand out on its inauguration day

=== Twin palace in Buenos Aires ===
In Buenos Aires, Argentina, the same architect built a very similar structure a few years earlier. Palacio Barolo is five meters shorter and has five fewer floors than the Salvo. It is an iconic building on Avenida de Mayo, featuring an architectural style that is difficult to categorize into a single movement.

Both buildings are inspired by Dante Alighieri’s Divine Comedy, but only Palacio Barolo in Buenos Aires was designed with the intention of housing the author’s remains.

The original idea of Italian immigrant Mario Palanti, the architect of both buildings, was to connect the two cities with a "bridge of light" over the Río de la Plata, using the lighthouses placed on their domes as a welcoming beacon to the region. However, due to miscalculations, the beams of light never managed to meet.

== Cultural impact ==
- The song "The Tower of Montevideo", included in Damon Albarn's 2021 album The Nearer the Fountain, More Pure the Stream Flows, is inspired by this building.

== See also ==
- Palacio Barolo
- List of tallest buildings in Uruguay
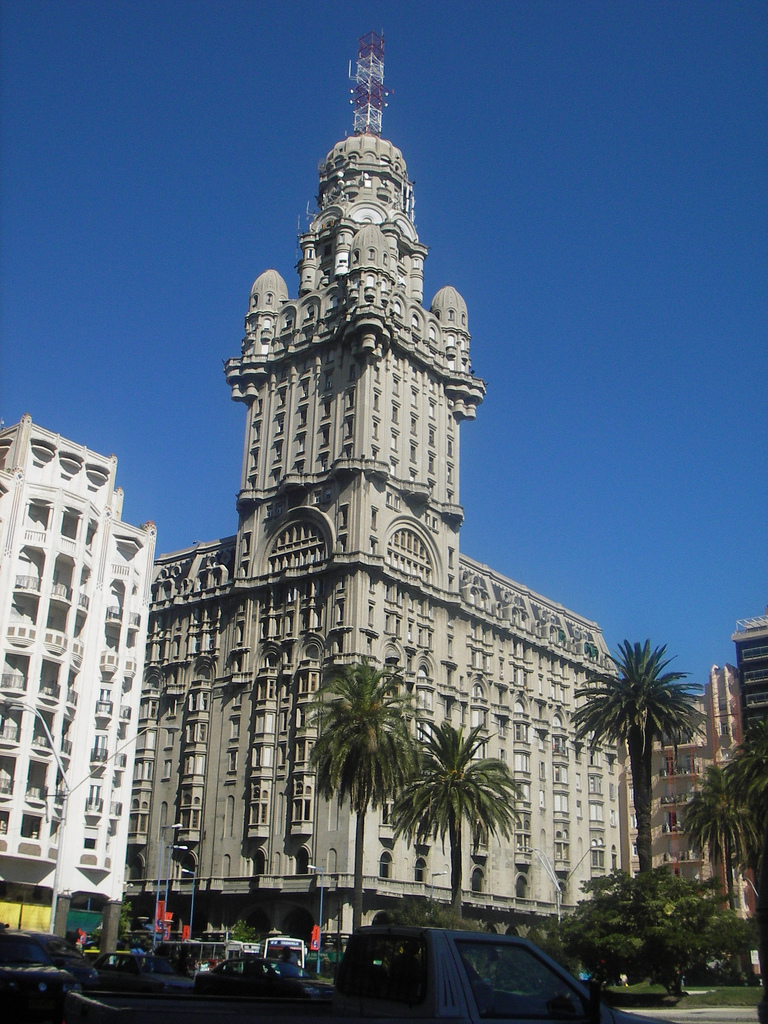
Front view of the building prior to antenna removal

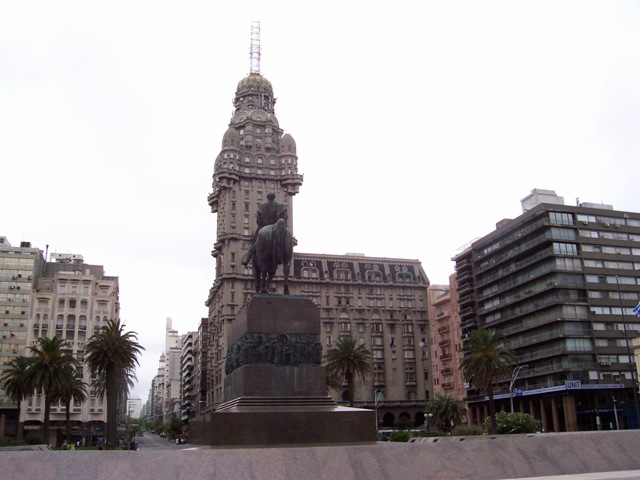
View of the Artigas Mausoleum, with the Palacio Salvo in the background.

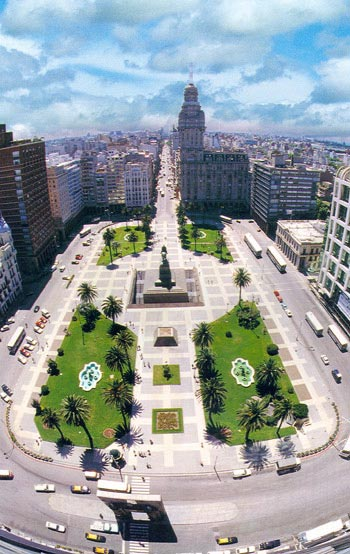
Plaza Independencia. The Gateway of the Citadel, the Artigas Mausoleum and the Palacio Salvo can be seen in the picture.
