= Gateway of the Citadel =

Coordinates: 34°54′23.4″S 56°12′2.8″W

The Gateway of the Citadel

The Gateway of the Citadel (in spanish: Puerta de la Ciudadela) is the only remaining piece of the military fortress that defended the walled city of Montevideo. The Citadel of Montevideo was a military fortress built by the Spanish in 1741 and demolished 1877. Its gateway was disassembled brick by brick and relocated to a technical school building, which saved it from being lost, in 1959 it was moved again and reconstructed in its original location, next to Plaza Independencia, in Ciudad Vieja.

It is commonly mistaken as the old entrance to the walled city of Montevideo, this is incorrect, as the gates to the walled city were two, the gate of Saint John and the gate of Saint Peter, both were demolished in 1829 and are now lost.

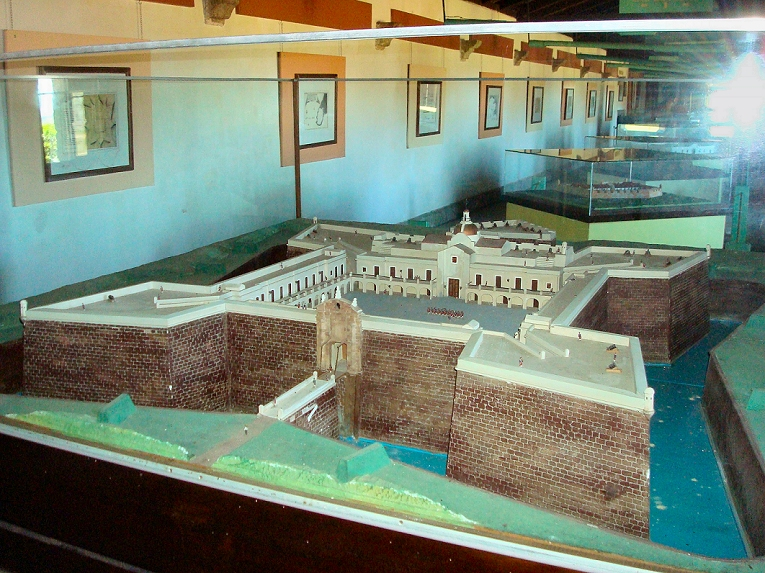
Replica of the demolished citadel, showing the position of the gateway.
