= Executive Tower, Montevideo =

Workplace of the president of Uruguay

Executive Tower
- Torre Ejecutiva
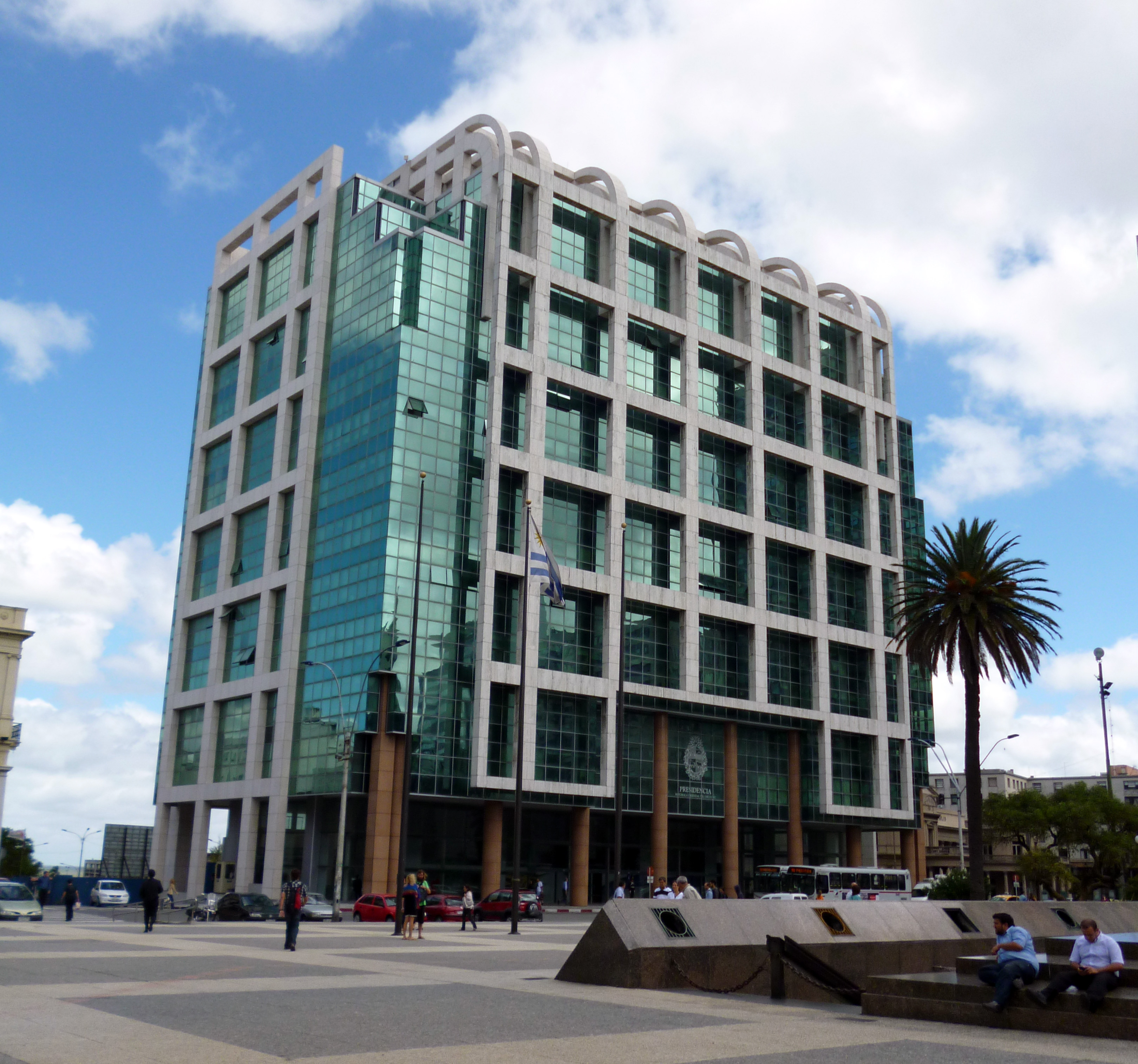
- Executive Tower
- Interactive map of the Executive Tower area
- Former names: Palacio de Justicia

General information
- Architectural style: Modern architecture
- Location: Plaza Independencia, Montevideo, Uruguay
- Construction started: 1965
- Completed: 2008
- Cost: US$20 million
- Owner: Legader S.A.

Height
- Height: 56 m (184 ft)

Technical details
- Structural system: Reinforced concrete
- Floor count: 12

Design and construction
- Architect: Studio 5
- Main contractor: Campiglia

Website
- Presidency of Uruguay

The Executive Tower (Spanish: Torre Ejecutiva) is the official workplace of the President of Uruguay. It is located in front of the Plaza Independencia, in Barrio Centro, Montevideo.

== History ==
The original project was started in 1965 as a future Palace of Justice, but the 1973 coup d'état interrupted it. By the time the military government ended in 1985, the building was too small for the Uruguayan justice system, so the project remained halted for decades until in March 2006, President Tabaré Vázquez decided to finish the building and use it as an extension of the Estévez Palace. The President's offices were transferred there from the Liberty Building in September 2009.

Despite the name, the building does not actually belong to the Presidency of Uruguay but to a fully government-owned company called Legader S.A., which is in charge of leasing office space to other public and private organizations to finance the work on the building.

== The building ==
The building has twelve floors, the first nine divided into two areas:

- North Executive Tower, overlooking the Plaza Independencia, where the Presidency of the Republic, the Office of Planning and Budget and the National Office of Civil Service work.
- South Executive Tower, overlooking the Rambla, where there are units dependent on the Presidency, such as the National Road Safety Unit and the Agency for Electronic Government and the Information and Knowledge Society and international organizations.

== Gallery ==
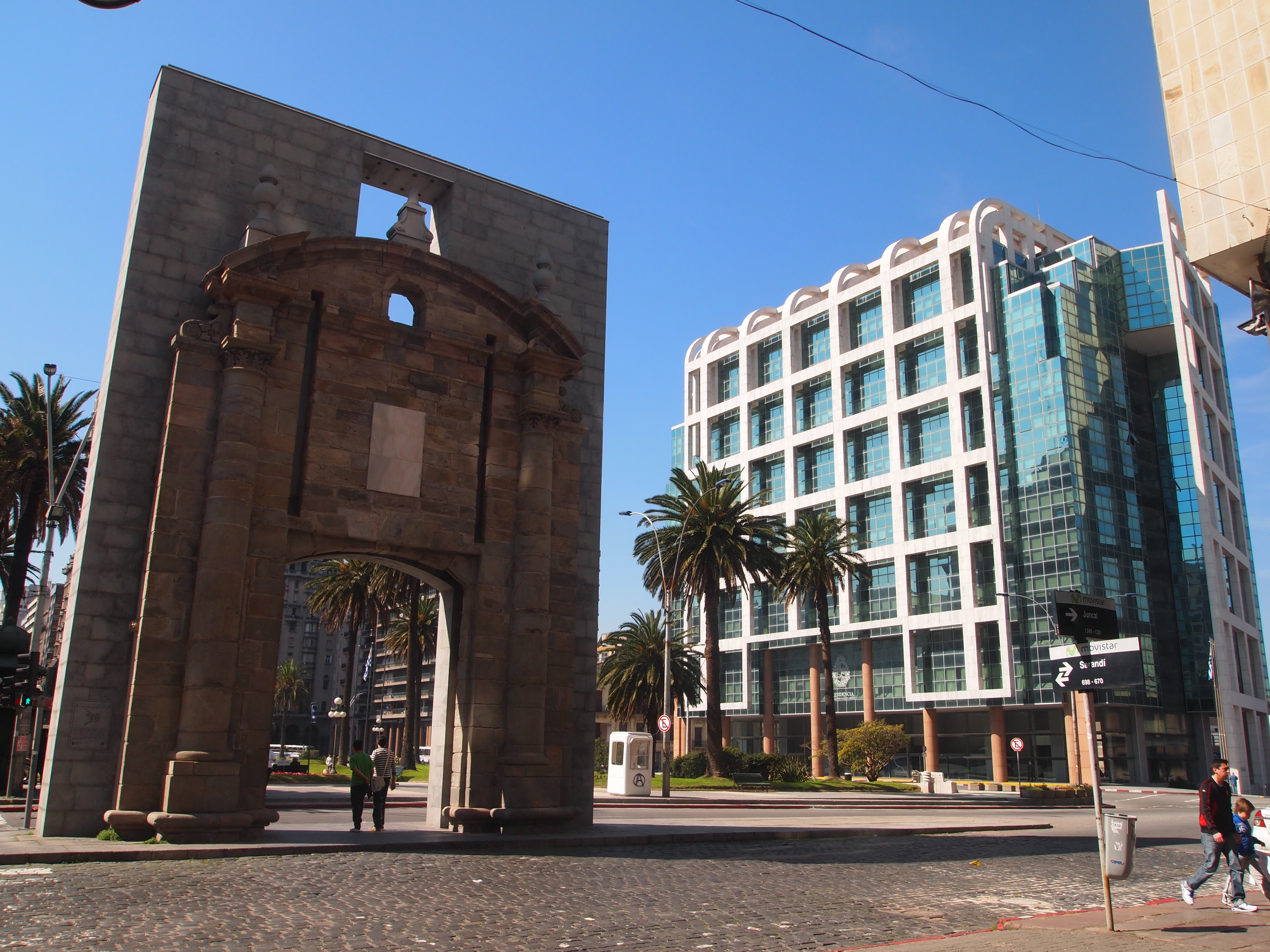
View of the Executive Tower from the entrance to the Old City.

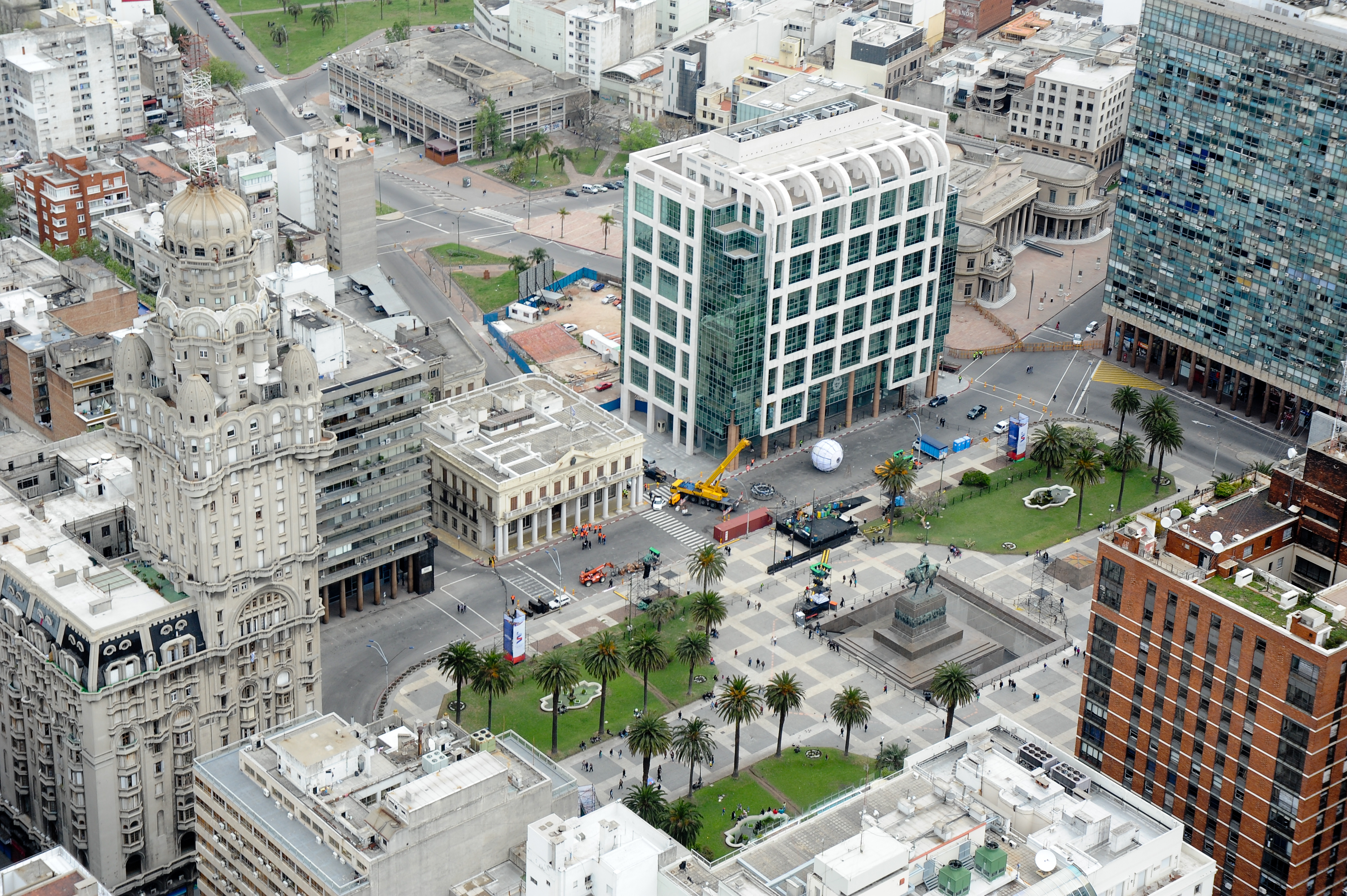
View of the Executive Tower from the air.

== See also ==
- Legislative Palace
- Estévez Palace
- President of Uruguay
- General Artigas Central Station
