= Liberty Building (Montevideo) =

Coordinates: 34°52′07″S 56°09′58″W

- Edificio Libertad
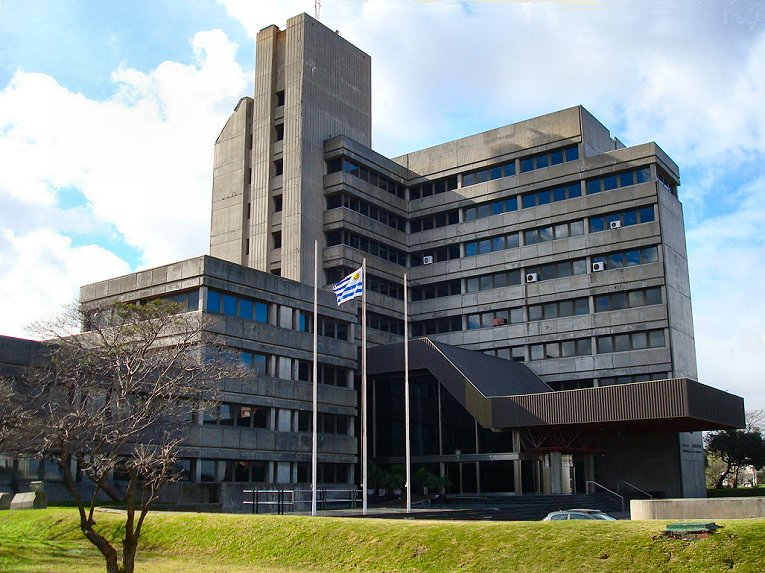
- Interactive map of the Liberty Building area
- Former names: Ministry of Defense

General information
- Type: ex House of Government
- Location: Montevideo, Uruguay
- Completed: 1985
- Owner: Government of Uruguay

Liberty Building (Spanish: Edificio Libertad) served as one of two executive office buildings of the President of Uruguay (the Estévez Palace being the other).

It was built in the 1970s during the military government for the Ministry of Defense, but in 1985, president Julio María Sanguinetti decided to move the presidential office to that building. Its surrounding area was turned into a park with a permanent exhibit of modern sculptures, which was inaugurated in 1996.

In 2006, President Tabaré Vázquez announced that he would be moving the presidential offices to the Executive Tower and turning the Liberty Building into a hospital. It is currently the headquarters of the State Health Services Administration.
