= Plaza Independencia =

Public square in Montevideo, Uruguay

Coordinates: 34°54′23.4″S 56°11′59.1″W

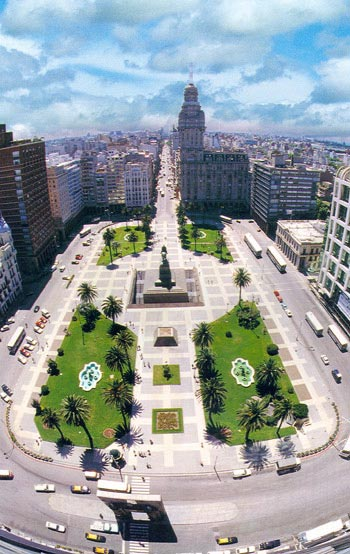
- Interactive map of Plaza Independencia
- Location: Centro, Montevideo

Construction
- Inauguration: 1837

Plaza Independencia (Spanish for 'Independence Square') is the main public square of Montevideo, Uruguay. It was laid out in the 19th century on the site formerly occupied by the Citadel of Montevideo, marking the transition between the old fortified city and the modern urban expansion.

Situated in Central Montevideo, at the boundary with the Ciudad Vieja, the square has long served as a venue for major political demonstrations and official public ceremonies. Notable buildings facing the square include the Palacio Salvo, the Solís Theatre, the Estévez Palace, and the Executive Tower.

== History ==
=== French inspiration ===
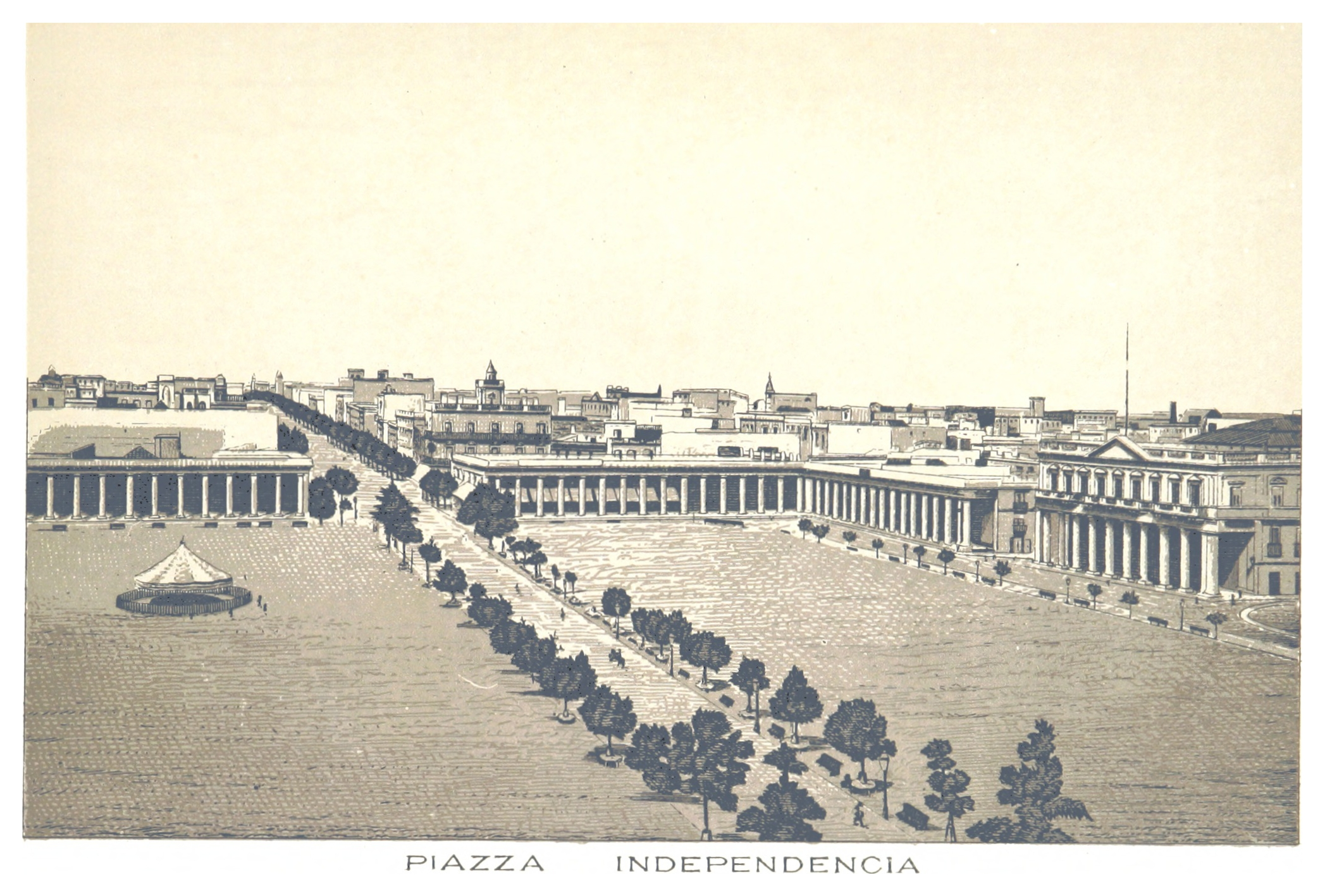
Plaza Independencia in 1885

Following the demolition of the colonial fortifications after the consolidation of independence, the former walled city was opened to urban expansion. In 1837, the Ciudad Nueva (“New City”) was planned, and architect Carlo Zucchi laid out what would become Plaza Independencia, reportedly inspired by the Rue de Rivoli in Paris. During the 19th century, the square emerged as a focal point of national importance, particularly with the construction of the Estévez Palace, which served as the seat of the Uruguayan government.

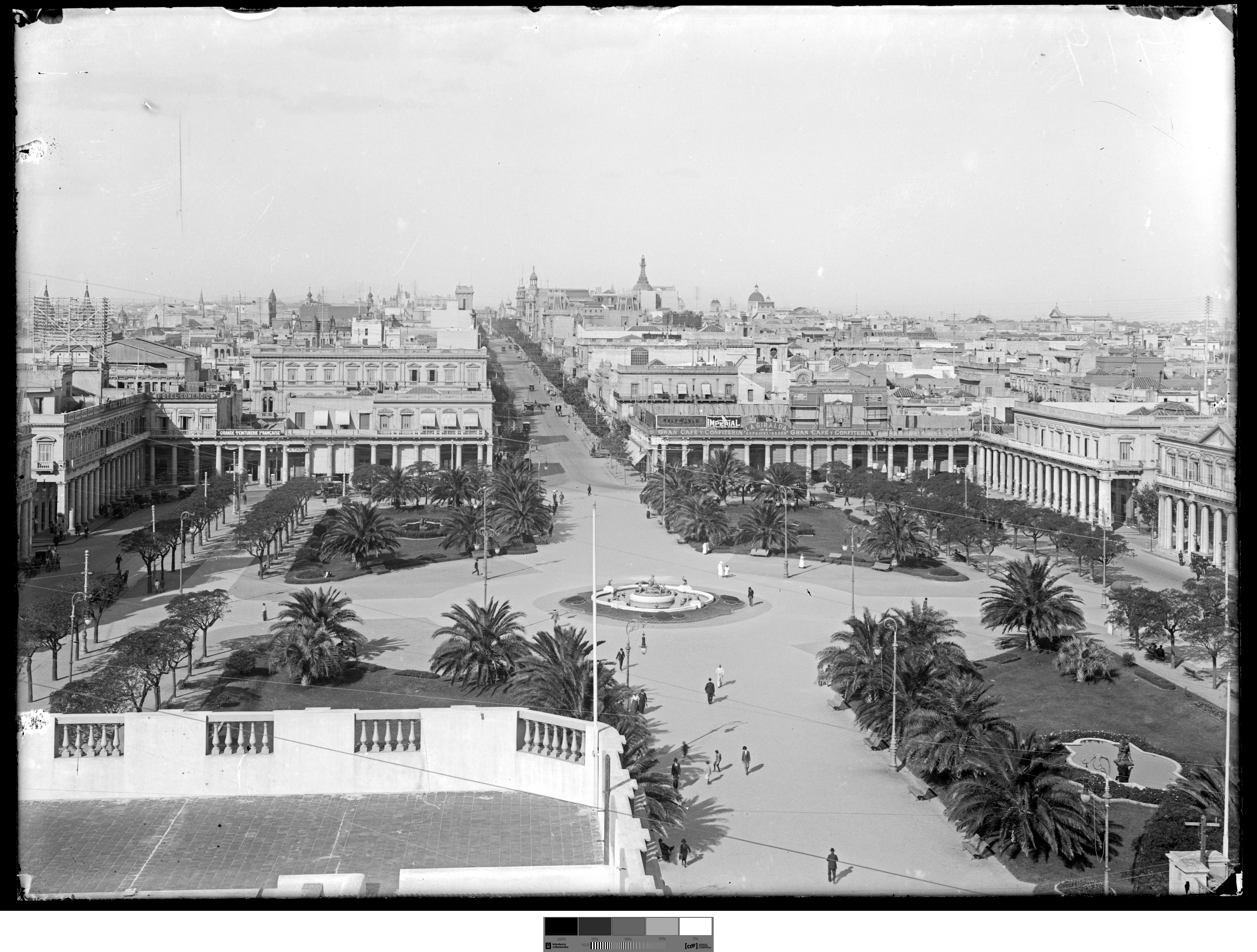
Plaza Independencia in 1917

At the beginning of the 20th century, French landscape architect Carlos Thays was commissioned to design the square’s landscaping, as the site had until then remained largely undeveloped. Thays introduced four French-style parterres with fountains and landscaped greenery, as well as a series of palm trees characteristic of his urban projects, which symbolically represent the Thirty-Three Orientals, leaders of the 1825 expedition that initiated Uruguay’s struggle for independence.

In 1923, during the presidency of Baltasar Brum, a monument to General José Gervasio Artigas was inaugurated. The monument consists of a 17-metre bronze equestrian statue set upon a granite base sculpted by Angelo Zanelli.

=== Uruguayan dictatorship ===
On 27 September 1974, during the civic-military dictatorship, the construction of an underground mausoleum beneath Plaza Independencia for the remains of José Gervasio Artigas was formally approved. His remains had been placed in the National Pantheon of the Central Cemetery in 1972, after being repatriated from Paraguay, where he had died in 1850.

Designed by architects Lucas Ríos Demalde and Alejandro Morón, the mausoleum features two broad granite staircases leading to an underground chamber housing the urn containing Artigas’s remains. A granite mastaba situated behind the monument above functions as a skylight for the subterranean space. The mausoleum was inaugurated and opened to the public on 19 June 1977—Artigas’s birthday, which is observed as a national holiday in Uruguay.

The site has a permanent honor guard from its body of soldiers (Cuerpo de Blandengues), the first in which Artigas served. The changing of the guard is a major ceremony and tourist attraction.

== Geography ==
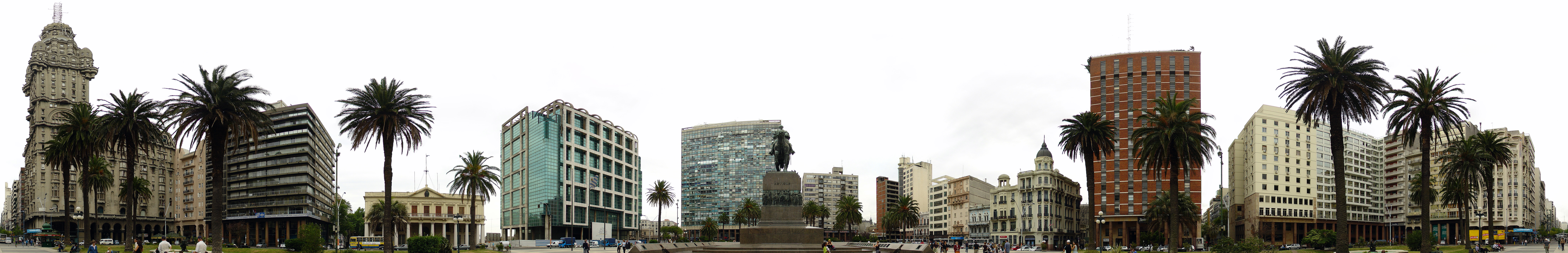
A 360-degree view of Independence Square in 2007

Surrounding the square are several of Montevideo’s most prominent landmarks. To the west stand the Gateway of the Citadel and the entrance to the Peatonal Sarandí. To the east rise the Palacio Salvo and the beginning of 18 de Julio Avenue, the city’s principal thoroughfare.

The Solís Theatre is located to the southwest, while the Executive Tower and the Estévez Palace—both seats of the Executive Branch—stand to the south. To the north is the Radisson Montevideo Victoria Plaza Hotel.

Eastern side
Northern side		Southern side
Palacio Rinaldi	18 de Julio Avenue	Palacio Salvo
Radisson Montevideo Victoria Plaza Hotel	Statue and mausoleum of José Gervasio Artigas	Estévez Palace
Radisson Montevideo Victoria Plaza Hotel	Statue and mausoleum of José Gervasio Artigas	Executive Tower
Ciudadela building	Gateway of the Citadel	Solís Theatre
Western side

== Events ==
Since 2010, the square has served as the venue for presidential inauguration ceremonies, specifically for the public transfer of the presidential sash, owing to its central location and its proximity to the Executive Tower, the president’s official workplace. The formal swearing-in of both the President and the Vice President, however, takes place at the Legislative Palace.

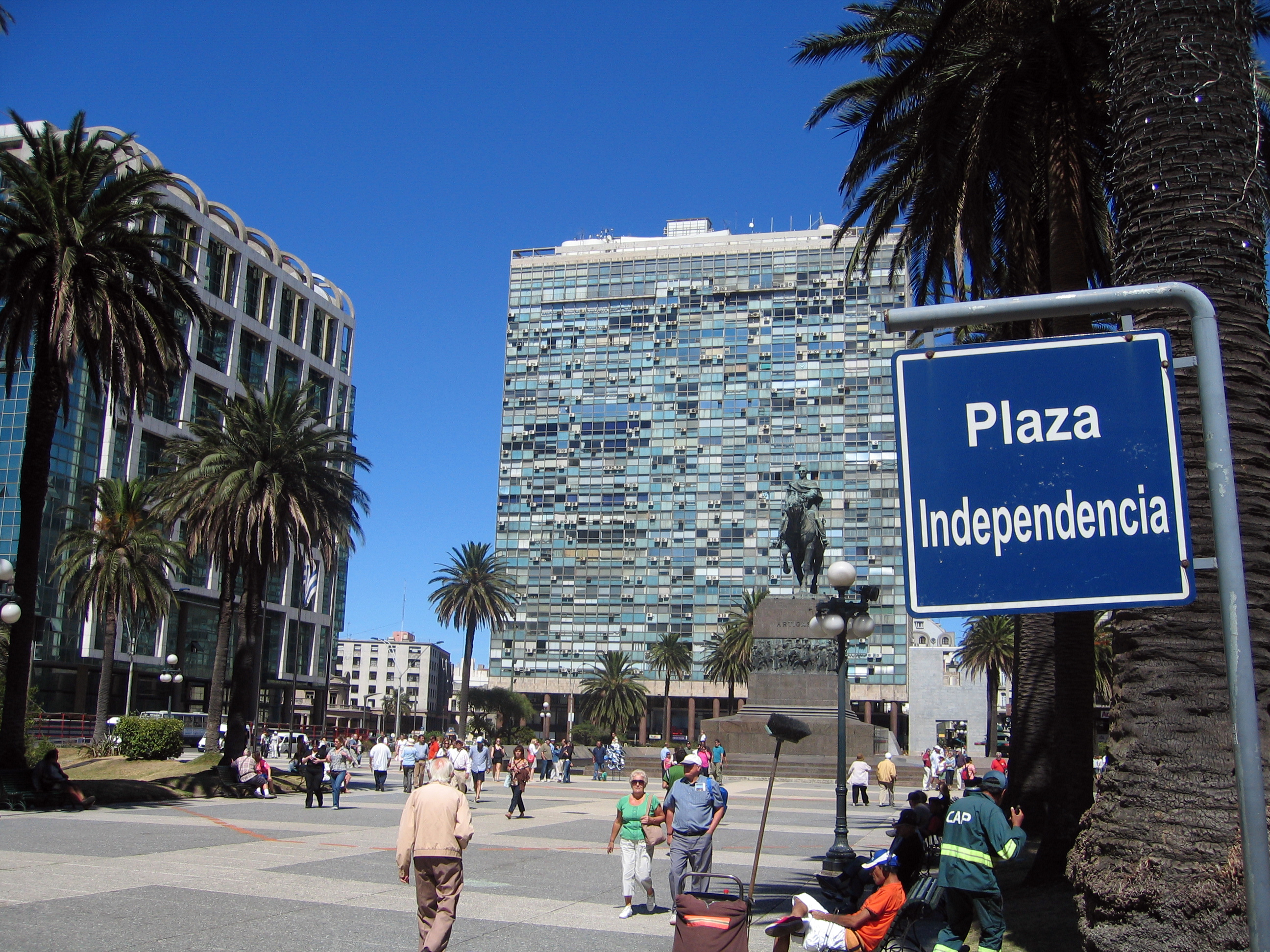
Plaza Independencia, Montevideo

The square serves as a principal venue for public demonstrations, patriotic celebrations, and official ceremonies, and is also the site where visiting foreign dignitaries lay wreaths at the Artigas mausoleum as part of state protocol. It is likewise the starting point of the Marcha de la Diversidad (Spanish for 'Diversity March'), an annual pride parade celebrating the LGBTQ community in Uruguay.

In May and June 2009 an exhibition of the "United Buddy Bears" was held in the square, for the second on the Americas.

== In popular culture ==
- The square is featured in the 2009 short film Ataque de pánico!, directed by Fede Álvarez, where square and a large part of the city of Montevideo is destroyed by giant robots and spacecraft.
- In 2010 the square was a filming location for a Lipton commercial, starring Hugh Jackman, where dance group performed a musical choreography in front of the Gateway of the Citadel and other parts of the Ciudad Vieja.
- Plaza Independencia appears in a 2014 Ministry of Transport and Public Works commercial to raise awareness about road safety. The announcement indicates that during 2013 in Uruguay more people died in traffic accidents than in the 2010 earthquake in Chile, and features the square being destroyed by a large earthquake.
- In 2019 the space was used to shoot the Netflix series, Conquest, produced by Keanu Reeves. The benches, bushes and traffic signs had to be removed and the adjoining streets painted, while the production lasted, which fenced off the perimeter of the square for several days.

== See also ==
- List of city squares in Montevideo
