= Estévez Palace =

Coordinates: 34°54′25.6″S 56°11′57.8″W

- Palacio Estévez
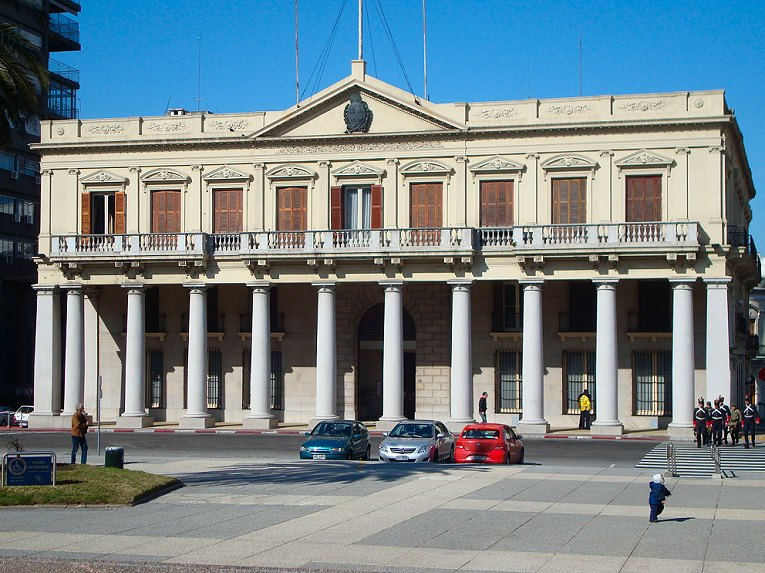
- Palacio Estévez
- Interactive map of the Estévez Palace area
- Alternative names: Edificio Independencia

General information
- Type: House of Government
- Architectural style: Classic architecture
- Location: Plaza Independencia, Montevideo (Uruguay)
- Construction started: 1873
- Completed: 1874
- Owner: Government of Uruguay

Design and construction
- Architect: Manoel de Castel

The Estévez Palace (Spanish: Palacio Estévez, pronounced [paˈlasjo esˈteβes]) is a building located on Plaza Independencia in Montevideo, Uruguay. Completed in 1873, it served as the country’s seat of government from 1880 to 1985. It currently functions as the executive ceremonial headquarters, hosting State ceremonies and other official events, while the adjoining Executive Tower serves as the workplace of the President of the Republic.

Built in the neoclassical style by Edouard Manuel de Castel and converted into the seat of government by President Lorenzo Latorre, it was designated a National Historic Monument in 1975. In 1999, a museum was established within the building, displaying artifacts and mementos pertaining to the Uruguayan presidency and its office holders.

== History ==
The construction of the building was commissioned in 1873 by Argentine entrepreneur and investor Francisco Estévez, who entrusted the project to the French-born engineer captain Édouard Manuel de Castel. Conceived as a residential palace, the building was erected on a city block owned by Estévez, located on land that had formerly marked the outer limits of Montevideo’s walled city. Construction was completed in May 1874, and the design complied with regulations requiring buildings surrounding Plaza Independencia to feature a Doric-style façade.

Estévez and his wife, Matilde Nin Reyes, took up residence on the second floor, while the ground floor, particularly the wing facing Ciudadela Street to the right of the main entrance, was leased to house the Italian Consulate as well as several commercial premises.

Estévez Palace in 1910.

In 1878, the property was acquired by the Uruguayan State, which purchased it from the Banco de Londres y Río de la Plata for 130,000 Uruguayan pesos, after the bank had taken possession of the building following the bankruptcy of Francisco Estévez. President Lorenzo Latorre subsequently designated the palace as the seat of government, prompting a series of architectural modifications to adapt it to its new institutional function. The renovation works were carried out under the direction of engineer Alberto Capurro, who preserved the original columned portico on the main façade and added a triangular pediment featuring the National Coat of Arms. Additional interventions included the remodeling of the principal balcony, the widening of the main entrance and staircases, the enlargement of reception halls, and the removal of the original belvederes. The refurbished building was formally inaugurated on 25 May 1880 by President Francisco Antonino Vidal.

In the 1950s, a series of renovations were carried out to adapt the building to the functions of the National Council of Government, during Uruguay’s collegiate executive period. In 1985, following the country’s transition to democracy, President Julio María Sanguinetti decided to relocate the seat of government to the Liberty Building, which had previously served as the headquarters of the Ministry of National Defense. Between 1987 and 1989, the building underwent an interior refurbishment led by architect Enrique Benech in collaboration with artist Manuel Espínola Gómez, resulting in partial modifications to the layout of the upper floor.
