= Galerie Zak =

Galerie Zak was an art gallery that was founded in Paris, France, in 1928 and specialised in modern European and South American art until its closure in the late 1960s.

The gallery was notable for hosting the first solo exhibition by Vassily Kandinsky in Paris, as well as exhibiting works by Marc Chagall, Amedeo Modigliani and Jules Pascin and Bela Czobel.

The gallery was established by Jadwiga Zak (née Kon, 1885–1943) in 1928. She was known to all as Madame Zak, although her husband, the Russian/Polish painter Eugeniusz Zak (also known as Eugène Zak), had died in 1926. The gallery established by Jadwiga at 16, rue de l'Abbaye, in Saint-Germain-des-Prés on Paris' left bank, became an important venue for Polish and Latin American art. It sponsored the first exhibition by members of the Paris Committee, known as the Kapists.

During World War II, both Madame Zak and her son were taken to Auschwitz, where they died in 1944. Although French collaborators liquidated the contents of the gallery in 1941, the art dealer Wladimir Raykis (or Vladimir Reikiss), executor of Jadwiga's will, reopened its doors in 1946.

== Partial list of artists ==
Artists that have been exhibited at Galerie Zak include:

- Albert Bockstael
- Suzanne Eisendieck
- Leopold Gottlieb
- István Beöthy
- Vincent Glinsky
- Diego Rivera
- Joaquín Torres García
- Eduardo Abela
- José Cuneo
- Bernabé Michelena
- Juan del Prete
- Amelia Pelaez
- Maurice de Vlaminck
- Maurice Utrillo
- André Derain
- Raoul Dufy
- Pedro Figari
- Amedeo Modigliani
- Horacio Butler
- Bela Czobel
- Józef Czapski
- Doris Brabham Hatt
