= Raúl Rial =

Uruguayan painter and engraver

- Born: Raúl Anton Rial; 12 October 1936; Montevideo, Uruguay
- Died: 2001 (aged 64–65)
- Known for: Painting
- Movement: Modernism
- Awards: Prize, Salón Municipal de Artes Plásticas, Uruguay (1967), Acquisition Award, Galería Latina (1983), Acquisition Award, Club del Lago, Punta del Este (1984), 2nd Prize, Centro de Navegación Transatlántica (1991)

Raúl Anton Rial (12 October 1936 – 2001) was a Uruguayan painter and engraver.

== Early life and education ==
Born in Montevideo, Uruguay, on 12 October 1936, Rial displayed an early talent for visual arts. He studied at the National School of Fine Arts in Montevideo, where the teachings of Joaquín Torres-García deeply influenced him. This foundational education helped Rial develop a modernist style while retaining a distinctly Uruguayan identity.

== Exhibition history ==
=== Solo exhibitions ===
- 1965: Amigos del Arte, Uruguay.
- 1967: Galería Azur, Uruguay.
- 1968: Patronato de la Cultura Gallega and Galería U, Uruguay.
- 1972: Galería Haller, Buenos Aires, Argentina.
- 1981-1993: Numerous exhibitions at Galería Bruzzone, Uruguay.
- 1997: Embajada del Uruguay en Santiago de Chile, Chile.
- 2001: Homenaje concert by the Filarmónica de Montevideo at Radisson Hotel, Uruguay.

=== Collective exhibitions ===
- 1963-1972: Regular participation in Salón Nacional de Artes Plásticas and other national events, Uruguay.
- 1968: Concurso Internacional de Dibujo Joan Miró, Barcelona, Spain.
- 1993-1994: Permanent Exhibition at Swiss Bank Corporation, Switzerland.
- 1999: Celebración del IX Centenario de la Orden de Malta, Malta.

== Artistic themes and style ==
Rial's works covered a diverse array of themes:

- Maritime Themes: Paintings of seascapes, ships, and ports reflected Uruguay's coastal culture.
- Musicians: Portraits and depictions of orchestra performers.
- Abstract and Everyday Life: Still lifes and scenes from daily Uruguayan life often combined abstraction with representational art.

His works are characterized by a modernist approach, blending abstraction and emotional resonance.

"Our lives were intertwined; he played the drums as a hobby, while I improvised with a pair of brushes. From that fusion of two arts came the most original aspect of Raúl Rial's work. He was the only painter I know who devoted himself to portraying the world of musicians. Perhaps someone might tell me that Degas had already done this, but the difference is that in the works of the excellent French painter, ballerinas are the protagonists, while in Raúl's paintings, the musicians take center stage." — Federico García Vigil, 2002

== Awards and recognitions ==
- 1967: Prize, Salón Municipal de Artes Plásticas, Uruguay.
- 1983: Acquisition Award, Galería Latina.
- 1984: Acquisition Award, Club del Lago, Punta del Este.
- 1991: 2nd Prize, Centro de Navegación Transatlántica.

== Memorialization of the Philharmonic Orchestra ==
In 2016, Rial's connection to music was celebrated through "Ensayos en el Solís", an exhibition at Montevideo's Solís Theatre. The exhibit commemorated the Montevideo Philharmonic Orchestra using Rial's artworks, which encapsulated the harmony of music and visual art.
