= Olimpia Torres =

Uruguayan painter

- Born: 1911
- Died: 2007 (aged 95–96)
- Known for: Painting
- Style: Constructivism, Abstract Art
- Relatives: Joaquín Torres García (father), Manolita Piña (mother)

Olimpia Torres (1911 – 2007) was an Uruguayan painter, influenced by the artistic legacy of her father, Joaquín Torres García. Her work and life were interwoven with the cultural and artistic movements of Uruguay and Europe, making her a notable figure in 20th-century visual arts.

== Early life ==
Torres was born in Uruguay in 1911. She was the daughter of Joaquín Torres García, one of Uruguay's most celebrated artists, and Manolita Piña. Torres grew up in a creative environment, which shaped her artistic inclinations.

Her early years were spent accompanying her father during his travels across Europe. These journeys exposed her to various artistic styles and avant-garde movements that would influence her own artistic vision later in life. Despite her father’s prominence, Torres developed a unique voice within the artistic community.

== Artistic career ==
Torres was inspired by her father’s theories of Constructivism, but she also explored other artistic avenues. Her paintings often reflected a strong sense of geometry, balance, and abstraction, hallmarks of her father’s teachings. However, she maintained a distinctive approach, blending these elements with personal and emotive expressions.

Torres's work was well-regarded in Uruguay and internationally. She participated in exhibitions that celebrated the Torres García family’s contribution to the arts and was recognized as a talented artist in her own right. Her dedication to preserving her father’s legacy also earned her widespread respect.

== Later years and legacy ==
In her later years, Torres focused on documenting and preserving the works and philosophies of her father. She played a significant role in ensuring that the legacy of Joaquín Torres García remained vibrant and influential. Through her efforts, many of his teachings and works were archived and exhibited, inspiring generations of artists.

Torres died in 2007 at the age of 96.
