= Joaquín Torres-García =

Spanish Uruguayan artist (1874–1949)

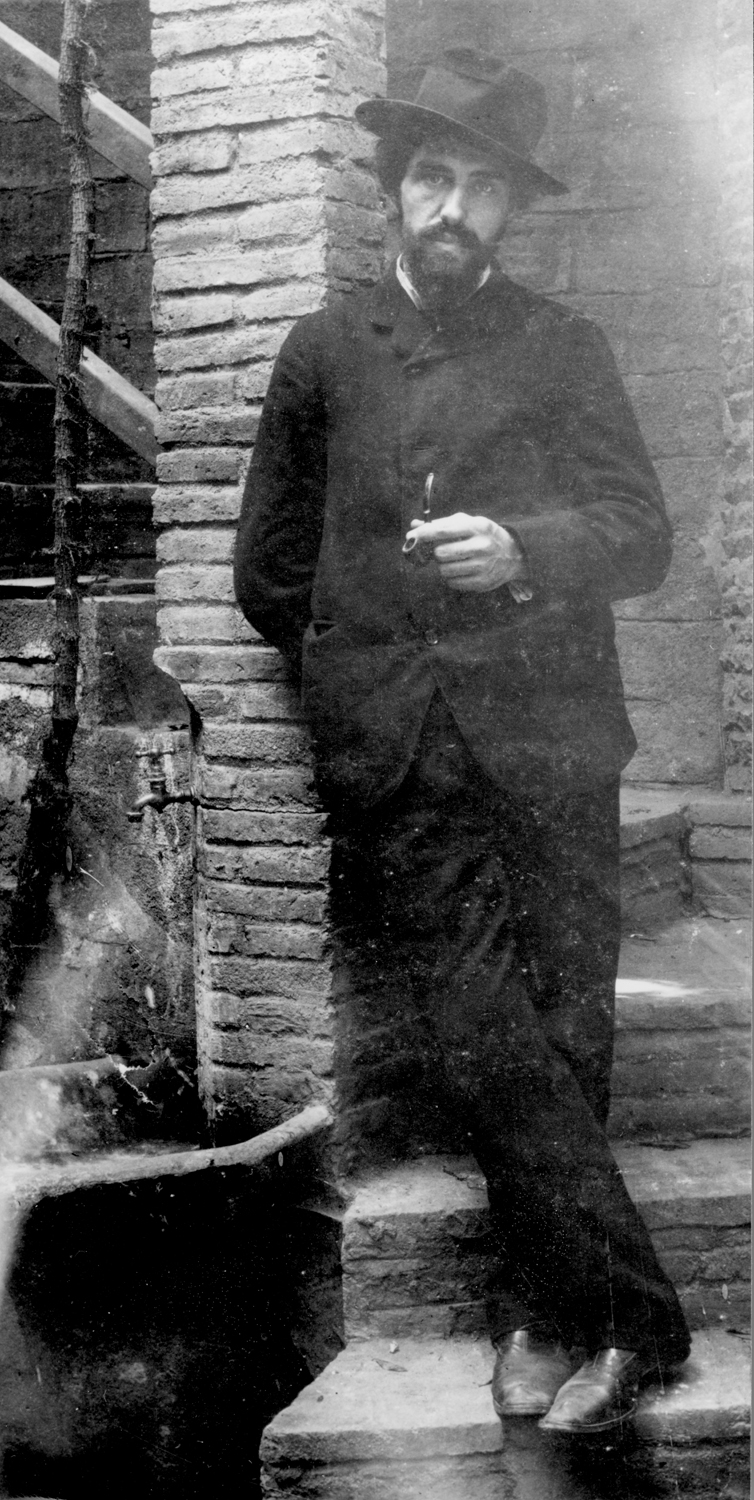
- Born: Joaquím Torras Garcia; 28 July 1874; Montevideo, Uruguay
- Died: 8 August 1949 (aged 75)
- Education: School of Fine Arts, Barcelona, Spain
- Known for: Painting, drawing, sculpture, murals, theory, writing, teacher
- Notable work: New York City: Bird's Eye View, 1920, Yale University Art Gallery Untitled Composition, 1929, National Gallery of Art Constructive Painting, 1931, The Met Fifth Avenue Construction in White and Black, 1938, Museum of Modern Art New York Composition, 1938, Solomon R. Guggenheim Museum
- Movement: Modern art, abstraction, conceptual art, Surrealism, Constructivism
- Spouse: Manolita Piña (m. 1909)
- Children: Olimpia Torres; Horacio Torres; Augusto Torres; Ifigenia Torres
- Website: jtgart.com

Joaquín Torres-García (28 July 1874 – 8 August 1949) was a Spanish Uruguayan painter, theorist, teacher and author, who spent most of his adult life in Spain. Later, traveled and lived in the United States, Italy, France, and Uruguay. One of the most influential artists of the 20th century, he is known for founding influential schools and groups, including the Escola de Decoració (School of Decoration) in Barcelona; Cercle et Carré (Circle and Square) in Paris—the first European abstract-art group, which brought together artists such as Piet Mondrian and Wassily Kandinsky; the Grupo de Arte Constructivo (Constructive Art Group) in Madrid; and the Taller Torres-García (Torres-García's Workshop) in Montevideo.

In his paintings Torres-García developed a pictorial language, that was a synthesis between representation and abstraction. His pictograms, figures reduced to signs that function like a written language, were embedded within a geometric composition. His structural principles were rooted in classical traditions derived from Greek and Roman culture; he experienced in Catalonia during his youth—He first referred to it as Modern Classicism, later evolving it into what became known as Universal Constructivism. At its core was his conviction that geometry constitutes a universal visual language, shared instinctively across cultures and eras.

== Early life ==
Joaquín Torres-García was born on July 28, 1874, in Montevideo, Uruguay, a bustling port city on the edge of the South American Pampas. He was the eldest child of Joaquim Torras Fradera, an immigrant from Mataró, Spain, and María García Pérez. His early years were spent in his father's general store 'Almacén de Joaquín Torres'.

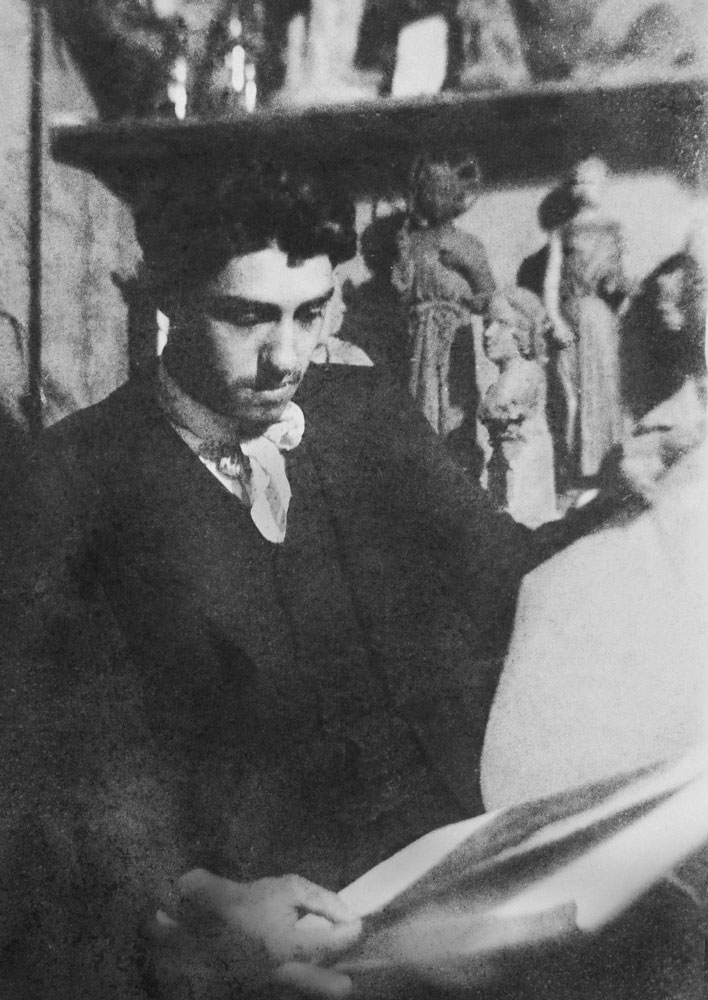
Joaquin Torres-Garcia c.1895

'The picturesque store was situated in the old Square of the Wagons, the arrival point for raw materials destined for export to Europe. Colonial Montevideo had a thriving port, railways, and a vibrant population, dotted with countless gauchos draped in capes, whips in hand.' He attended public school only sporadically, preferring to read, draw and to work in his father's store, inspecting all the merchandise arriving from abroad. "Much of his early education in this predominantly agricultural society came from observing the world around him..."

In 1891, Torres-García's father returned with the family to Spain, where he and his siblings became Spanish citizens. Young Torres-García studied under a local painter and quickly demonstrated a talent for art. He enrolled in the School of Fine Arts (Escuela de Bellas Artes de Barcelona), the Baixas Academy (Academia Baixas), and the Saint Lluc Artists' Circle.

Classmates included Ricard Canals, Manolo Hugue, Joaquim Mir, Isidre Nonell, Pablo Picasso, and Julio Gonzalez.

'Torres-García and Picasso were contemporaries, both beginning their artistic journeys in modern Barcelona, whose epicenter was the café Els Quatre Gats ...'

Torres-García contributed illustrations to the leading newspapers and magazines of the time, including La Vanguardia, Iris, Barcelona Cómica, and La Saeta. His work gained recognition for its distinctive style and sharp artistic sensibility. In 1900, he faced a personal tragedy with the loss of his father.

== Career ==
Torres-García's first big break came with a solo show at Barcelona's Sala La Vanguardia in 1900. The exhibition caught plenty of attention, prompting Miguel Utrillo to write a review titled "Joaquín Torres-García, Decorator" in Pèl i Ploma. The piece included a portrait of the artist by Ramon Casas, photos of several of his works—one even landing on the cover—and marked the debut of Torres-García's first published text."Impressions."

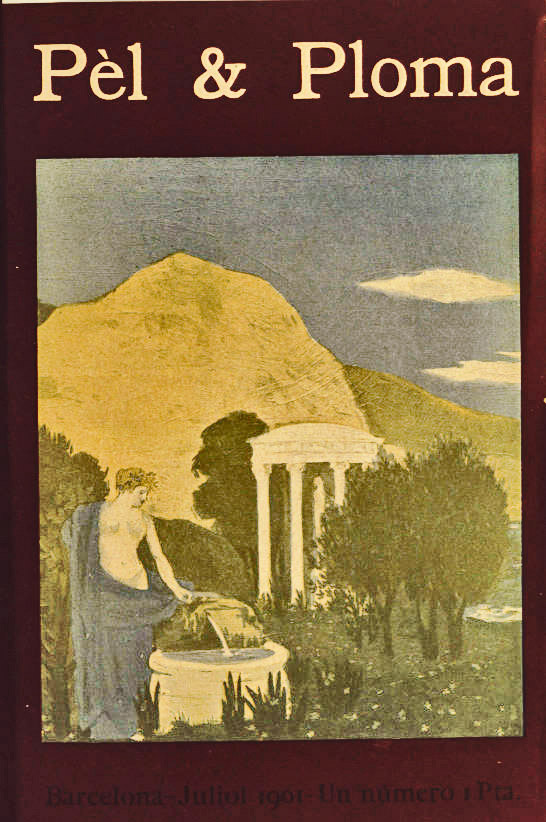
Pel & Ploma painting by Torres-Garcia

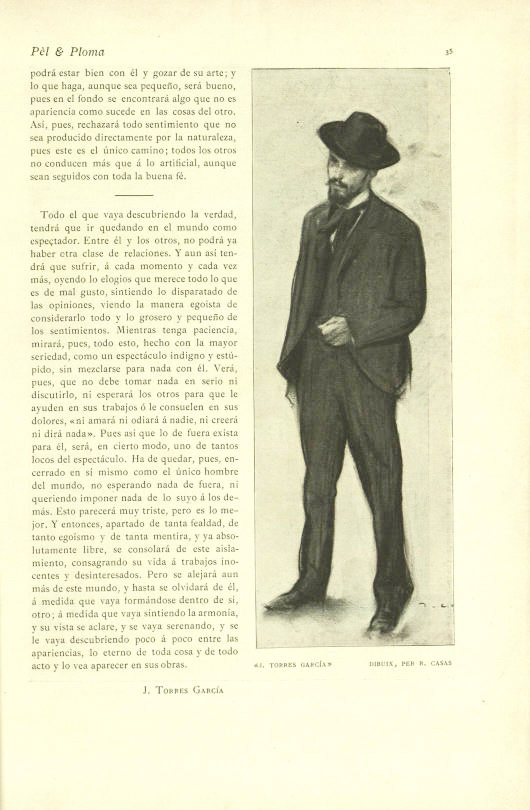
Portrait of Torres-Garcia by Ramon Casas

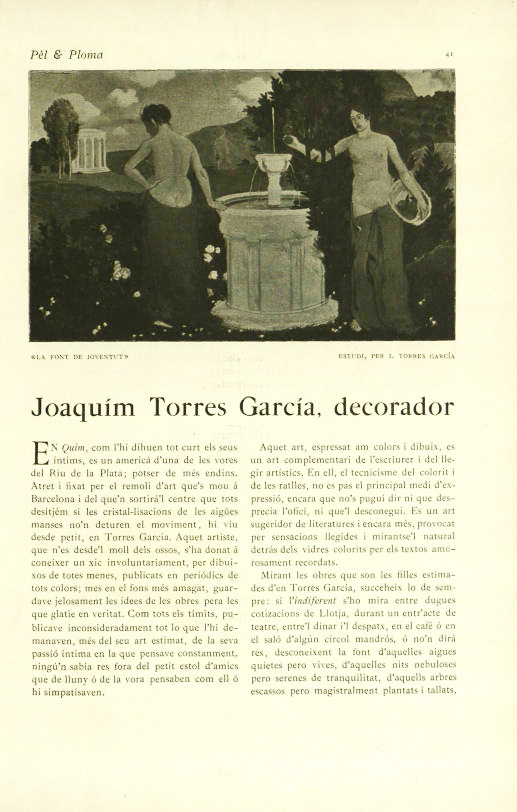
Painting by Torres-Garcia

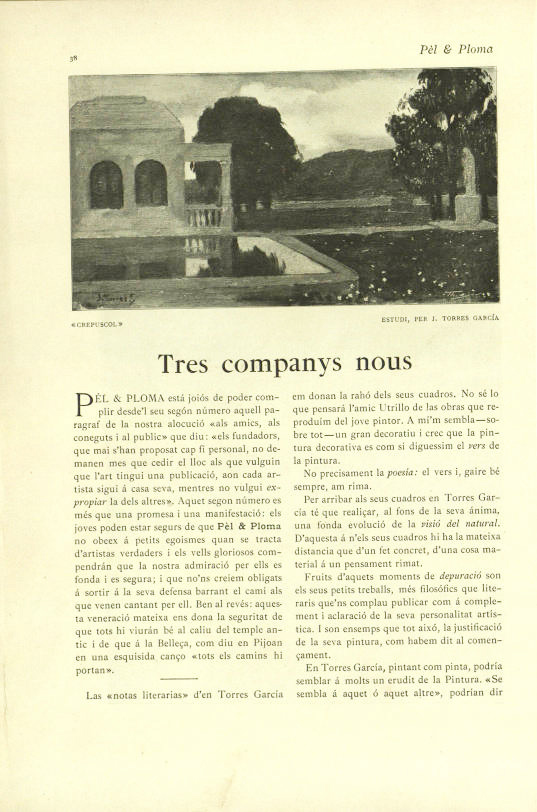
Painting by Torres-Garcia

In 1903, Antoni Gaudí commissioned Torres-García to design stained-glass windows for Palma Cathedral, a project that ran from 1902 to 1905. Torres worked with Ivo Pascual and Jaime Llongueras on stained-glass designs for the presbytery. He created the lateral windows and the small rose window in the apse, interpreting Marian symbols such as the sun, moon, star, well, garden, tower, and temple, themes he would revisit throughout his life.

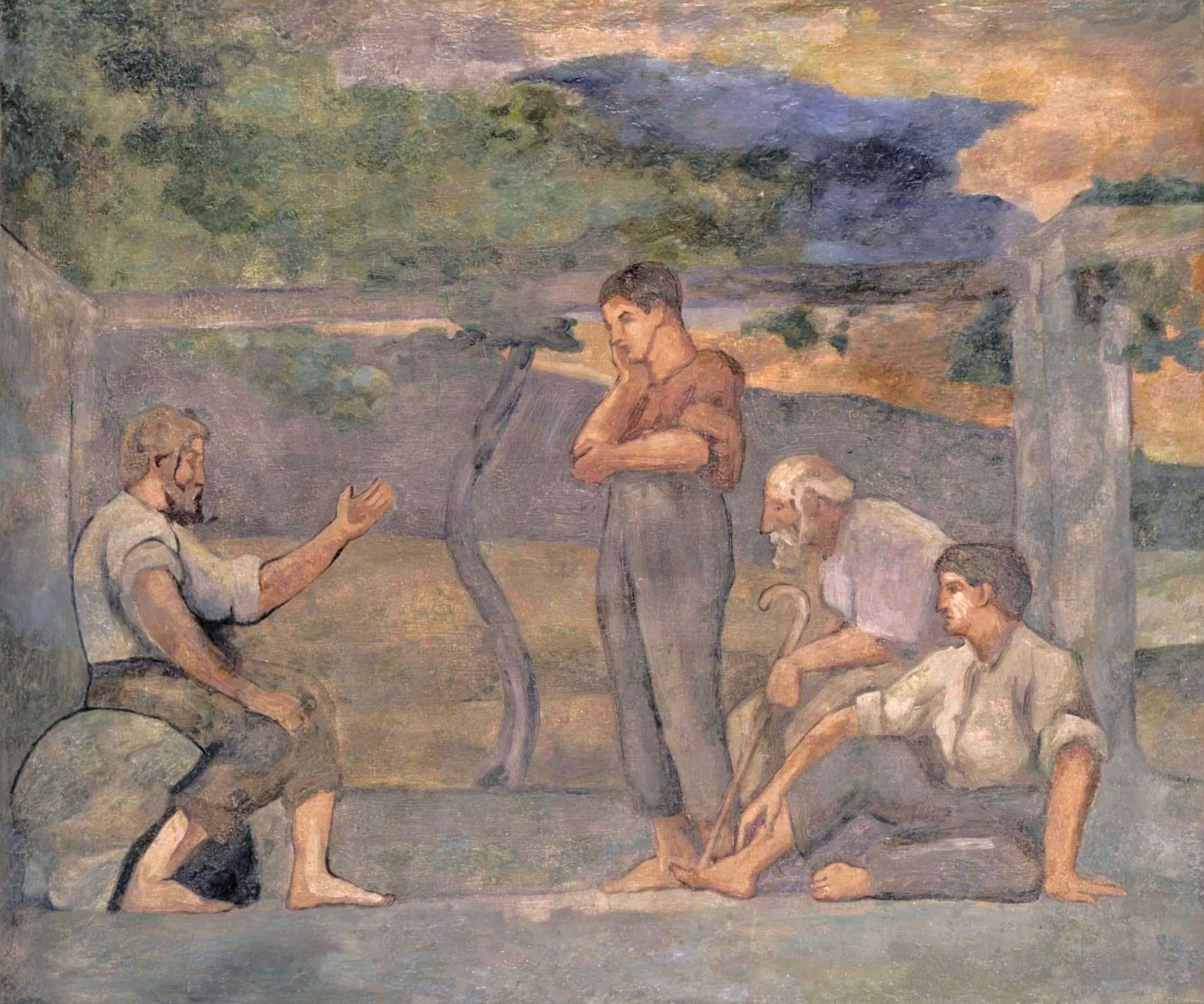
'The-Speaker' Mural in the house of Baron Rialp. Barcelona.

Through these commissions, Torres-García quickly became Barcelona's leading artist of his generation. His stained glass, murals, and decorative creations brought vibrant life to churches, public spaces, and private homes. Critics praised him, institutions sought him out, and patrons followed. By the end of the decade, he was the foremost artistic figure in Barcelona, shaping both its public image and its modern artistic language through his paintings, articles, and teaching.

In 1907, Torres-García began teaching in the experimental school Colegio Mont d'Or, founded by the progressive educator Joan Palau Vera. Breaking away from academic routines, the school ditched copying from casts, prints, and books, opting instead for drawing based on direct observation of real life, using everyday objects like leaves, fruit, fish, flowers, and animals. This method became the foundation of the visual language that would later define his Universal Constructivism, first developed as a pedagogical practice.

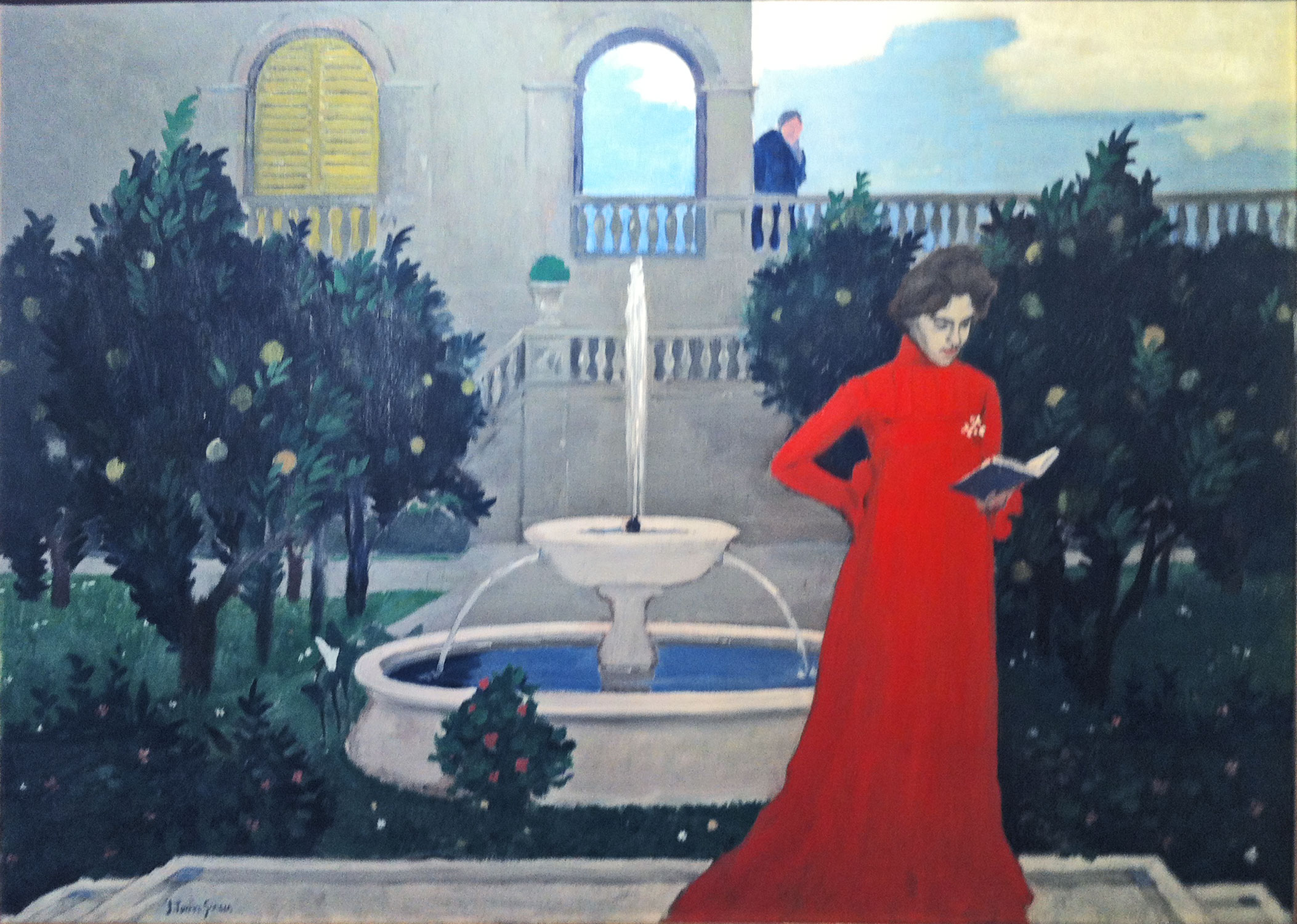
Portrait of Manolita Piña de Rubies.

Torres-García married Manolita Piña i Rubíes in 1909. She was the daughter of the merchant Jaume Piña i Segura, born in Palma (1830–1902), and Mercè de Rubies de Balaguer. The couple had four children who were also notable artists, two girls named Olimpia Torres and Ifigenia and two boys named Augusto Torres and Horacio Torres.

=== 1910 ===
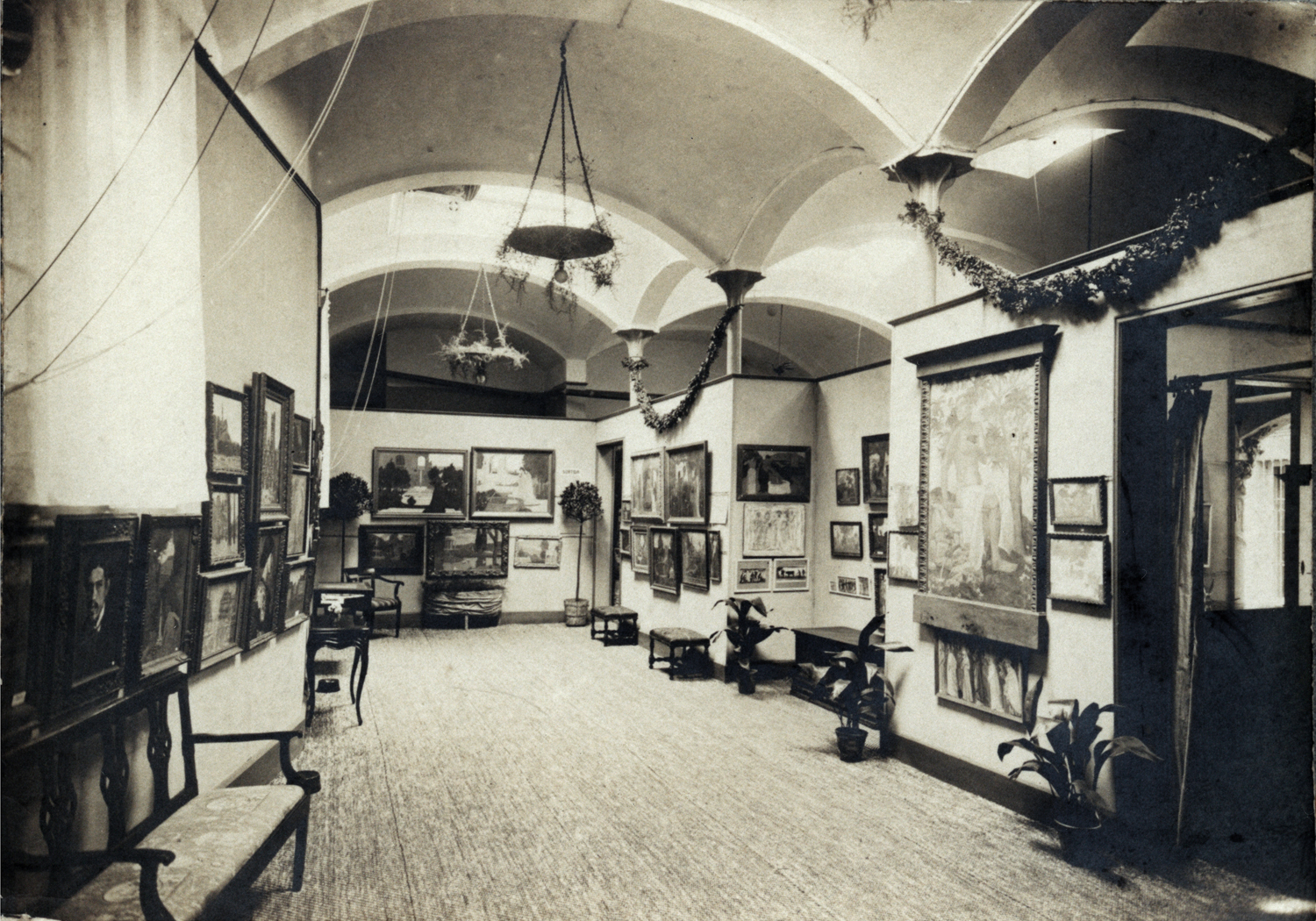
Galeries Dalmau, 1912 Torres-García solo exhibition in Barcelona

Shortly after the wedding Torres-García and Manolita journeyed to Brussels where he was commissioned to paint murals for a pavilion at the Brussels International World Fair. Five months later they spent an extended period in Paris, where he explored museums and galleries, visited friends and studios. Around this time, his work started to show elements of cubism, reflecting the ideas outlined in "Du Cubisme," published in 1912.

In 1911, Torres-García displayed the painting 'Philosophy X Musa' at the sixth International Exhibition of Art in Barcelona, subsequently donating it to the Institut d'Estudis Catalans. Since its debut, this work has been consistently recognized by historians as a foundational piece of noucentisme. Torres-García created a second version of this painting, which is now housed in the collection of the Reina Sofia Museum in Madrid.

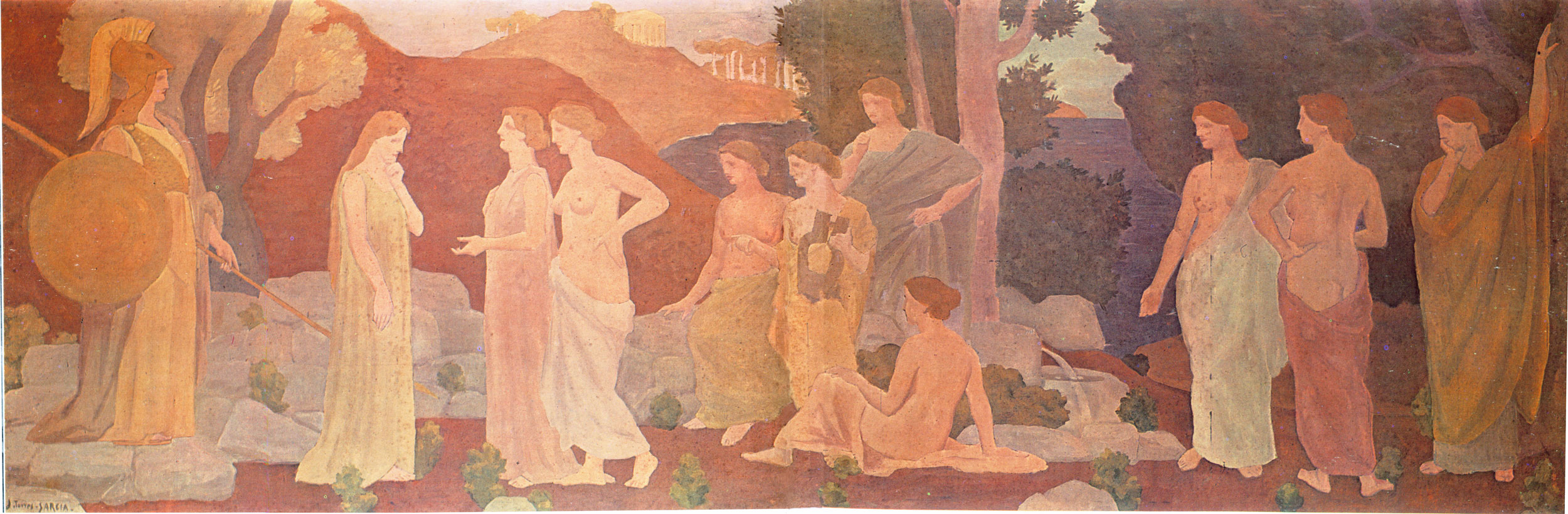
Philosophy Xª Muse

In 1912, two exhibitions were held at the Galeries Dalmau: Torres-García (works from his Noucentista period) and Pablo Picasso, with drawings from his Blue Period (February - March 1912).

Torres-García published his first book, Notes sobre Art (Notes on Art), in May 1913. In the introduction, he wrote: "These short essays may be of interest also because they are closely related to, something that is alive, sprung from our tradition, in thought and in reality, to form the true Renaissance of Catalonia" ("Aquestes curtes notes poden tenir interès, demes, per anar estretament lligades, com quelcom de viu, a tot o que arrencant de la nostra tradició, en el pensament i en la realitat, tendeix a formar el ver Renaixement e Catalunya").

Torres-García founded the Escuela de Decoración (School of Decoration/Decorative Arts) in Sarrià. "Prat de la Riba (president of the Council) had then his newly formulated conception of Catalan nationalism, and sees in the Mediterranean tradition proposed a positive content for the national profile, rich in spiritual substance."

Prat de la Riba commissioned Joaquín Torres-García to paint frescoes for the atrium of the Municipal Palace of Barcelona, the fifteenth-century Gothic seat of the Catalan government. Over the following five years, Torres-García completed four monumental frescoes and studies for two additional compositions. The murals became emblematic of Catalan Noucentisme. He worked on the first mural for 13 days, beginning on 28 July 1912, and it was unveiled on 13 September of that year.

The four completed frescoes are entitled La Catalunya Eterna (Catalunya Eternal), L'Etat d'Or (The Golden Age), Les Muses (The Muses) and Lo temporal no es mes que simbol (The Temporal is Nothing But a Symbol). The murals were hidden from 1926 to 1966.

"In the fourth mural... Torres-Garcia represented a gigantic Pan-God with a quote from Goethe's 'Faust' at his feet: 'The temporal is only a symbol'. 'That is the key to all the poetics of Torres-García, the will to surrender to the ephemeral in order to reach eternity,' explained Llorens. For Torres-García, classicism was the door of a better future, not a brake for modernity."

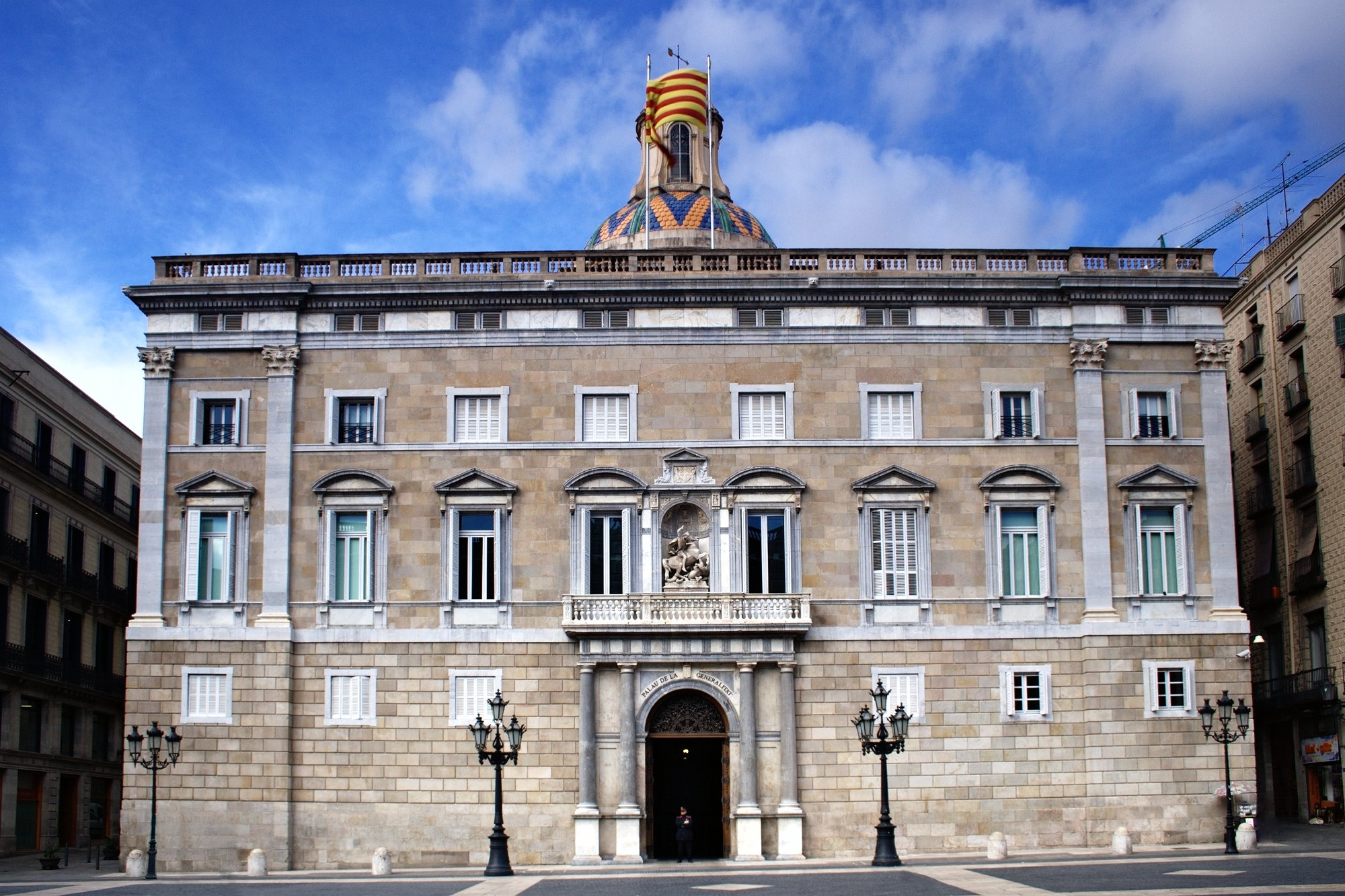

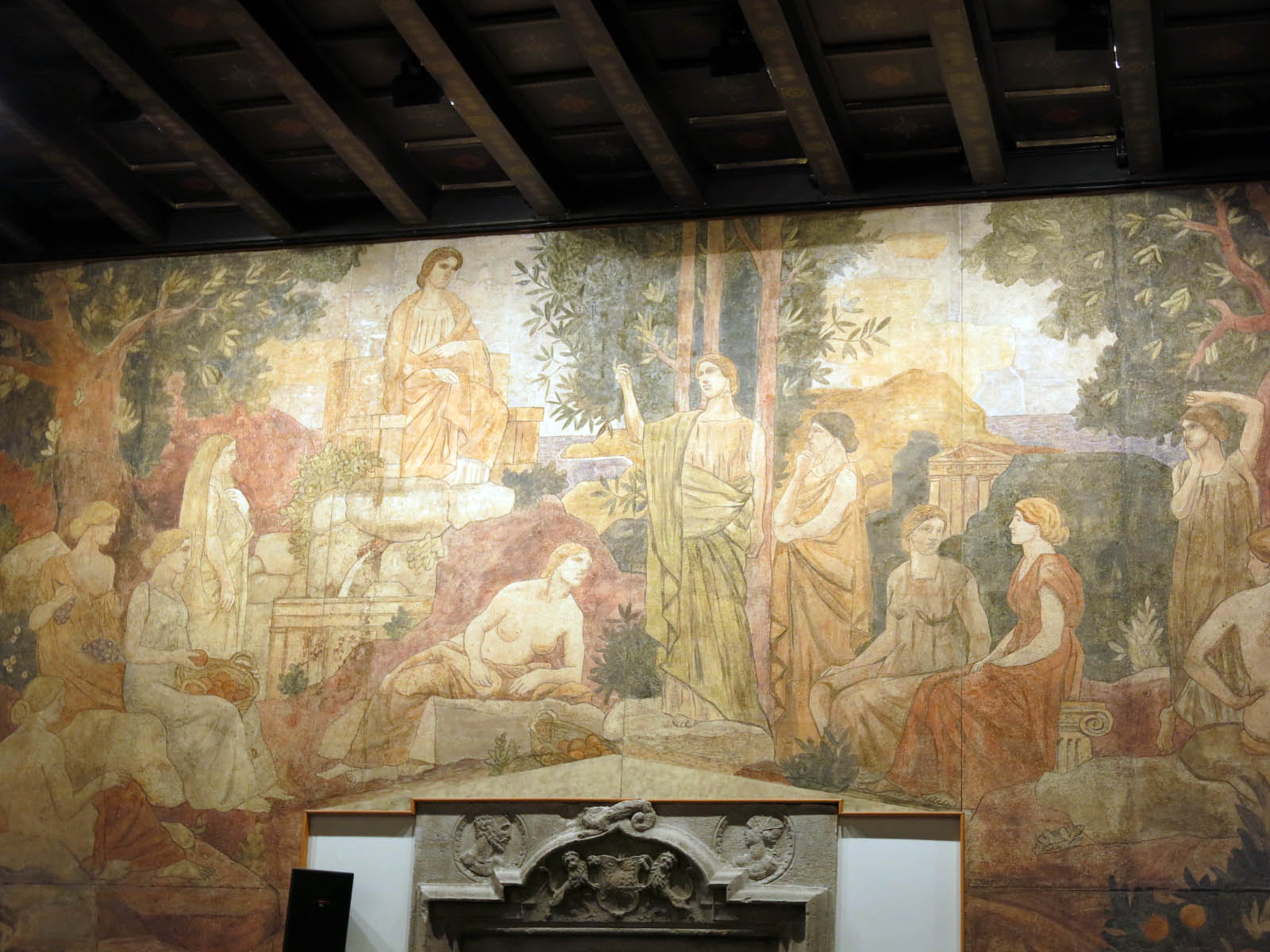

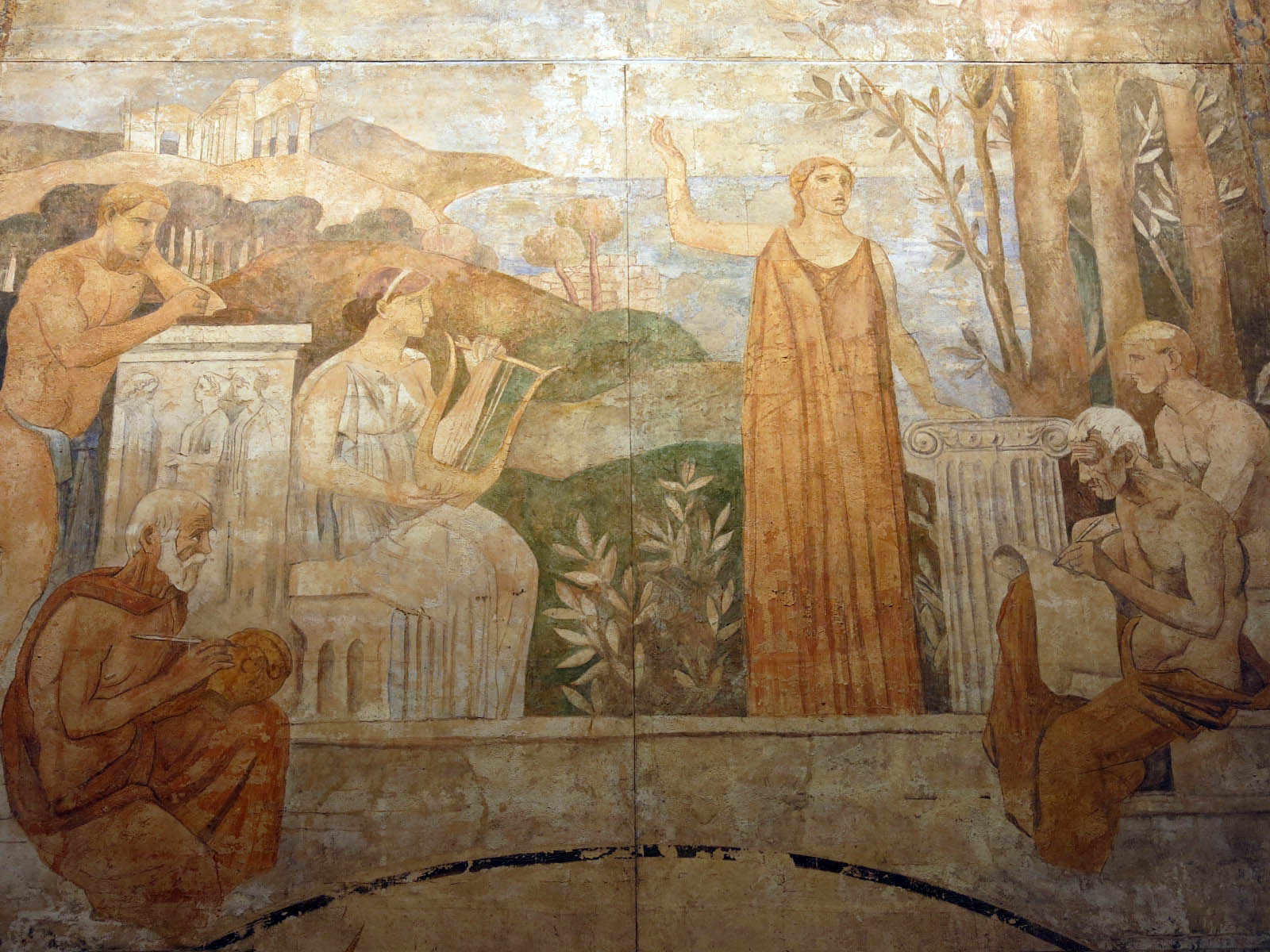

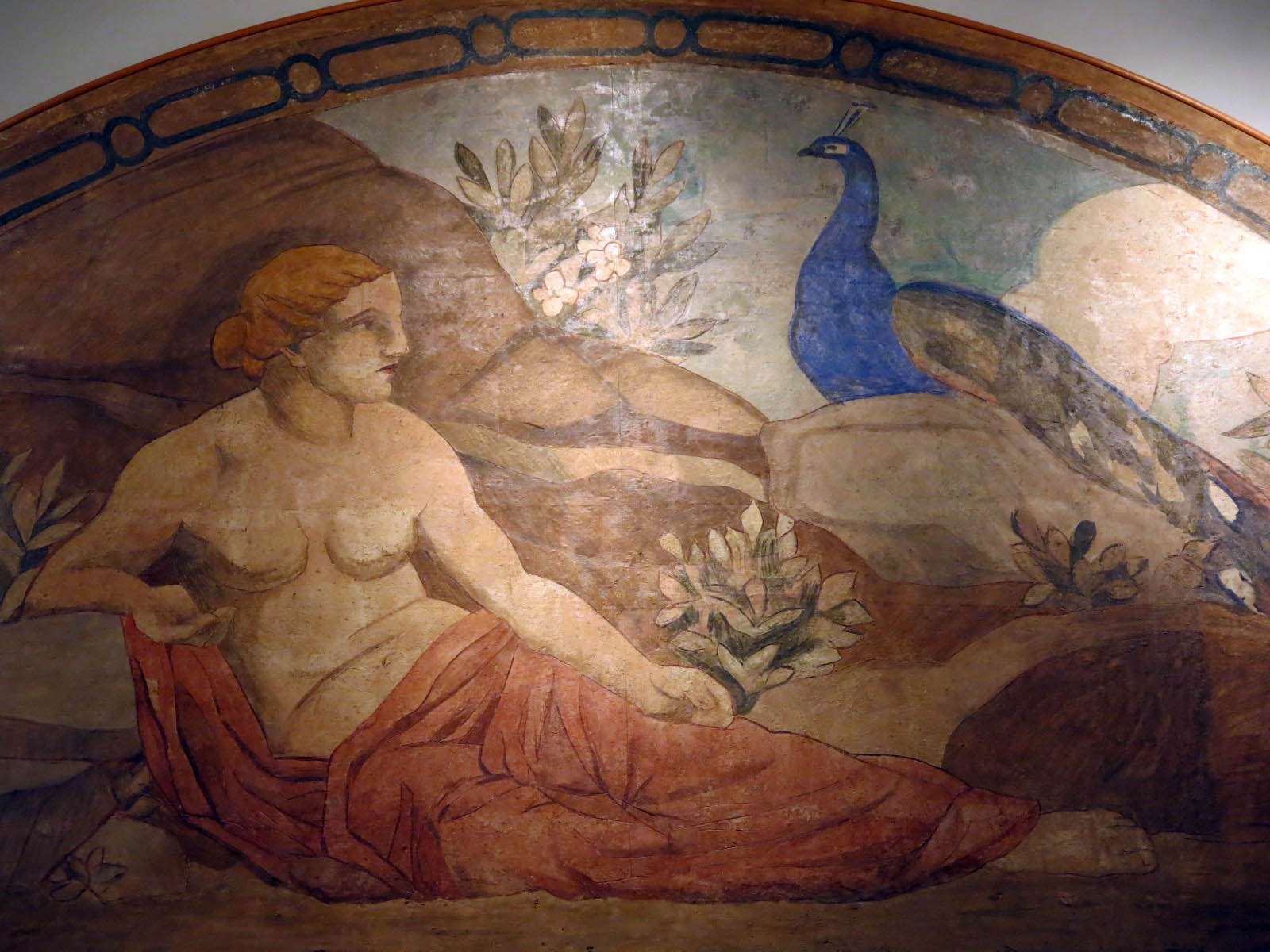

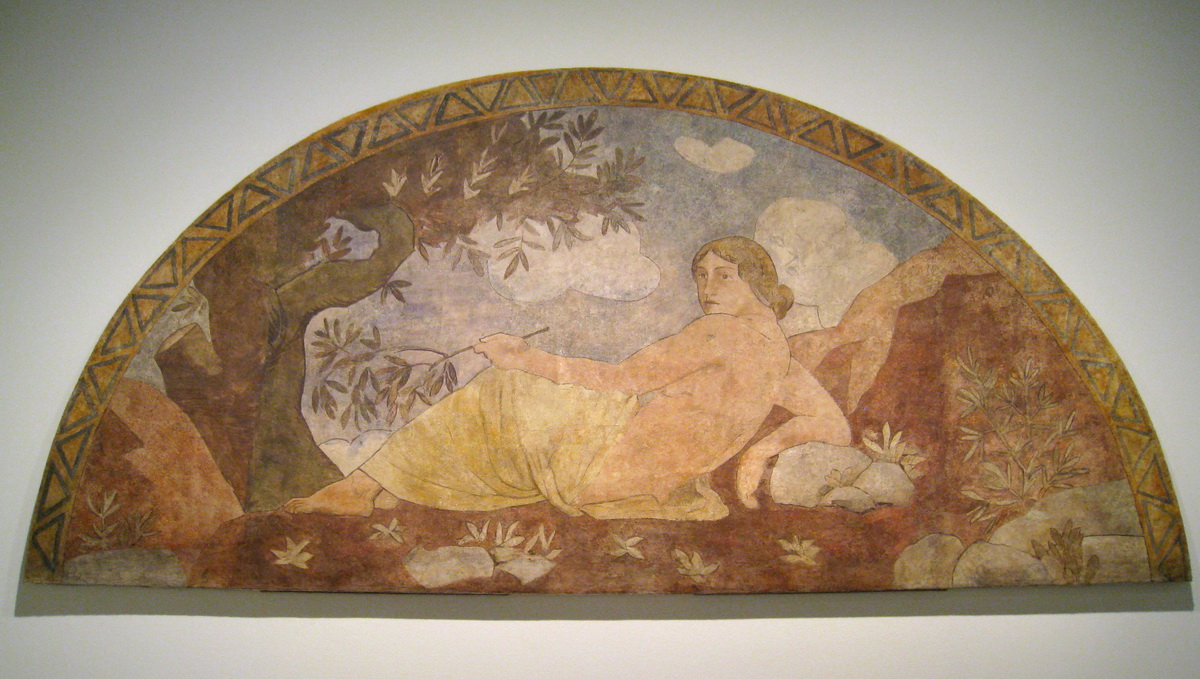

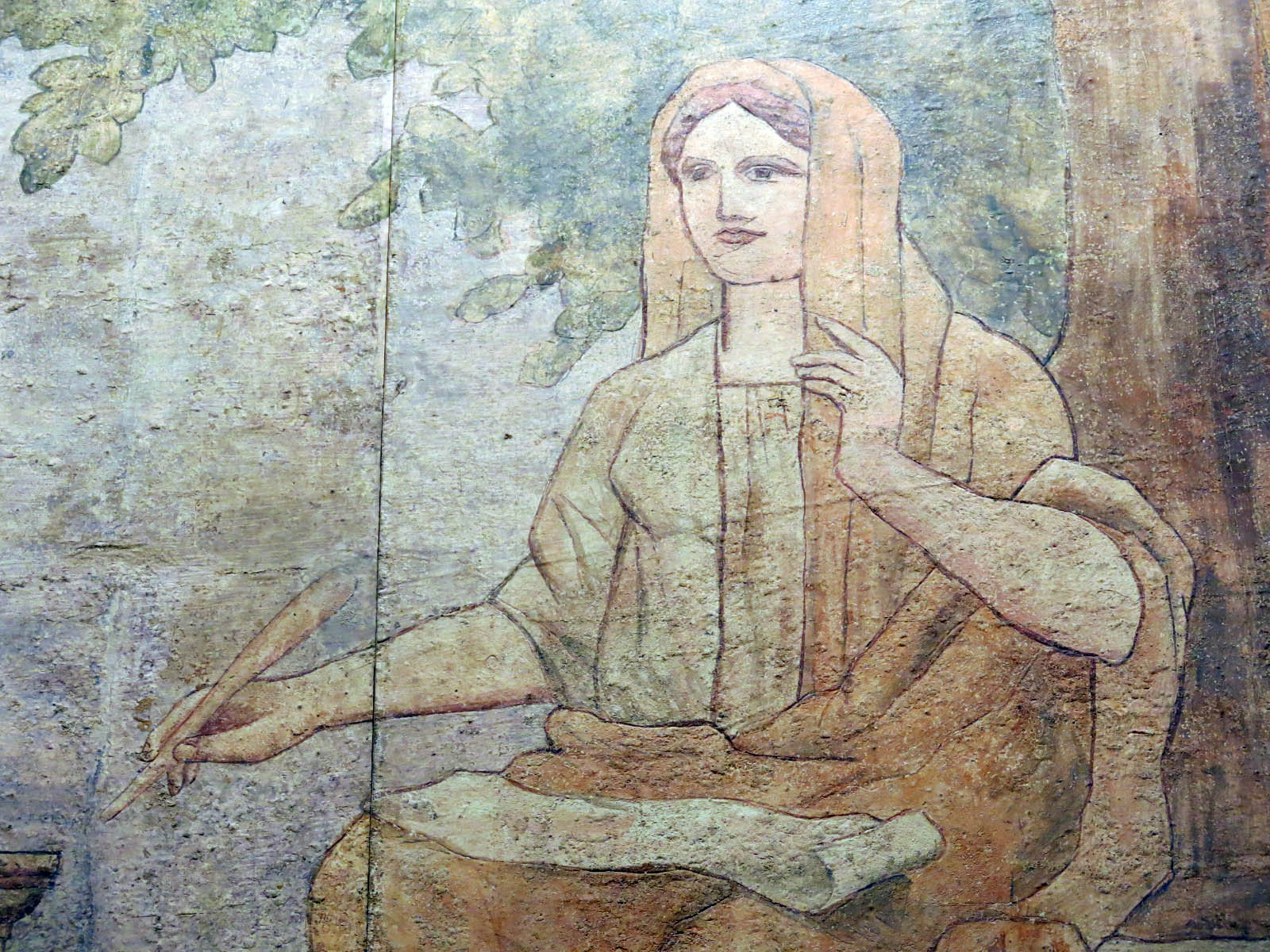

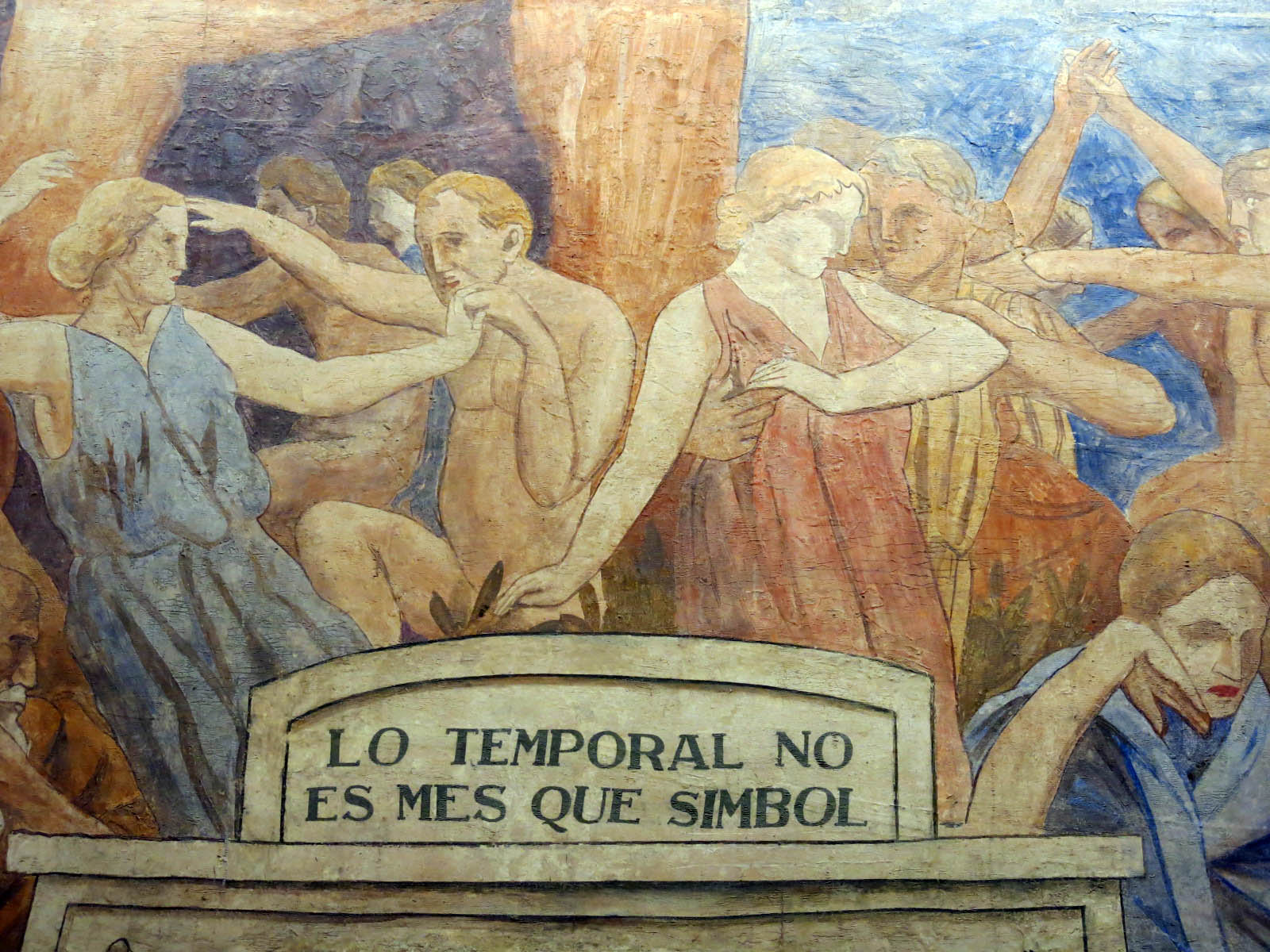

Torres-García used iconostatic composition for pagan subjects adapted to modern themes, demonstrating that classicism is not unique to the Greeks. What interested him was the rhythmic structure underlying the image, an idea he later described in El Descubrimiento de sí mismo and Evolucionista (both published in 1917). The same structural principles would later reappear in his Constructivist works.

He designed and decorated his home in Tarrasa ("Mon Repos") with frescoes, and invited friends and pupils to a housewarming party.

In 1918, "Torres-García can be seen exploring the grid structure," on the one hand as an inherent characteristic of a modern city and on the other as a form to explore the symbolic potential of everyday motifs. He also explored the potential for language within images, as in the 1916–17 drawing "Descubrimiento de si mismo (Discovery of Oneself)."

He presented an exhibition at Galeries Dalmau of "Joguines d'Art (Artistic Toys)": "The toys teach children which are the correct colors, the correct forms. Each toy is a form, a color that mixes with other shapes and colors and finally becomes a whole: a dog, a car, a city. The toys guide future generations to acquire a natural eye."

=== 1920 ===
Torres-García visited Paris for a second time with thirty-two crates of paintings, his intention was to travel to United States. In Paris he met with Picasso, who advised him to remain in Paris: "Do not to go to America, because it will be like leaping into a void".

In comparing their work, they discovered that his style shifted from classicism to Cubism, while Picasso's took the opposite path. Torres-García traveled to New York. "He determined to take the pulse of the greatest and most modern of cities, New York."

"Despite being one of the most important artists of the moment, Torres García did not lull, and in 1920 he went to New York to continue exploring what they called modernity and began to cling to the ephemeral and temporal, what he drew in the city of skyscrapers connects with what John Dos Passos reflected in Manhattan Transfer." He drew all, cityscapes, featuring bridges, boats, cars, and people. He also wrote the manuscript *New York*, which he completed in Paris in 1926. He met everyone, visited speakeasies, published articles, and even painted theater scenery.

He lived in Manhattan: first on 49th Street, then on 14th Street and finally on West 29th Street. He painted a series of portraits, including one of Joseph Stella. Alongside partners like Gertrude Vanderbilt Whitney and others, he revised a version of his Artistic Toys he had originally created in Barcelona through a company called Alladin Toys.

He exhibited at the Whitney Studio gallery and the Society of Independent Artists with Stuart Davis and Stanisław Szukalski in 1922, describing his work as "expressionistic and geometric at the same time, and very dynamic".

In 1922, Torres-García returned to Italy, settling just outside Florence and moving the toy production there due to the lower costs.

During this time, he was hit with bad news: his mother passed away, and Spain banned the Catalan language, including all of his writings.

He settled in Villefranche-sur-Mer in 1925 and had another solo exhibition at Galeries Dalmau in Barcelona.

Torres-García returned to Paris for the third time in 1926, and was a key animator of the interwar abstract movement over the next six years.

He exhibited 34 works, a series of large, classical nudes, and paintings from New York at the Galerie A. G. Fabre, gaining recognition among peers. "Forty works make up this presentation of Torres-Garcia first exhibit here at Galerie Fabre: frescoes, fragments of large murals, assembled architectural maquettes, still life or figures... They show the artist under different aspects manifesting all the fiery wealth and complex diversity. Some urban landscapes will give an idea of the passage of Torres-Garcia by New York where a feverish spectacle of the business city captivated some time his artistic inquietude in search of its rhythm. Although he has played a major role in the development of the Mediterranean school, Garcia is bent with such a force towards his personal inclination he has always cleared away from the prejudices of isms (schools) that might limit his personal growth."

"However, by returning to the Classicism of his early work he made it clear that this was not an artistic language he had sought to vanquish through abstraction". Torres-García was part of a May 1927 group show with Stanislaw Eleszkievicz and Runser at the Galerie d'art du Montparnasse and had a solo exhibition of paintings at the Galerie Carmine from 16 to 30 June 1927.

He had a solo exhibition at the Galerie Zak in December 1928 and was part of a group exhibition at the Galerie des Editions Bonaparte with John Graham, Kakabadze, Tutundjian, and Vantongerloo in August 1929. Torres-García then had another solo exhibition at the Galerie Carmine.

As a correspondent for the Catalan literary magazine Mirador, he wrote a series of articles on painters, including an interview with Georges Braque.

=== 1930 ===
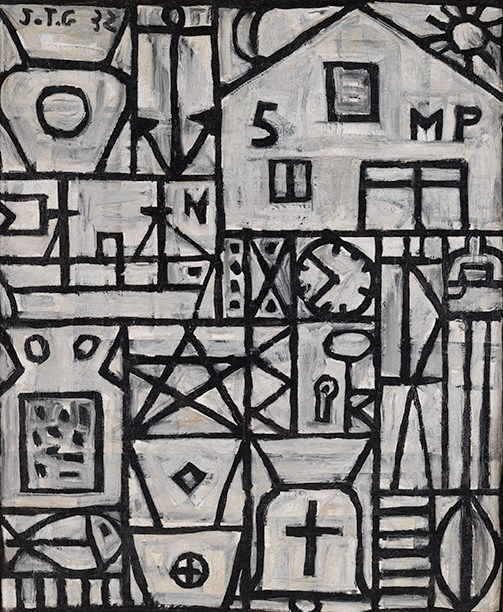
Joaquín Torres-García, "Constructive" Oil on canvas, 65 x 54 cm. Collection Patricia Phelps de Cisneros.

For Torres-García, Constructivism was no different from Neoplasticism—just another label. What truly mattered was crafting a new image and a new visual language within a traditional composition, where he skillfully balanced representation and abstraction using signs.

He had two solo exhibitions in 1931 at the Galerie Jeanne Bucher and the Galerie Percier, and a group show in October of that year at the Galerie Georges Petit with Giacometti, Ozenfant, Max Ernst, Joan Miro, and Salvador Dalí.

The following year, Torres-García presented a solo exhibition of paintings and sculptures at the Galerie Pierre. "The friendship between van Doesburg and Torres-Garcia will create the foundations for the three most important movements to promote abstract art: "Cercle et Carre" (1929–1930), "Art Concret" (1930); and "Abstraction-Creation"(1931–1936)."

He founded the magazine Cercle et Carre and assembled a group of 80 artists to exhibit .

Torres-García left for the Madrid and finished the manuscript of Arte Constructivo, which was published in 1935 under the name of "Estructura" and dedicated to his friend Piet Mondrian.

He returned to Montevideo in April 1934 for the first time after forty-three years.

In August of that year, Torres-García exhibited paintings, sculptures and the work of the Cercle et Carre group and reedited the magazine as Circulo y Cuadrado.

He published Historia de mi vida (Story of My Life) an autobiographical novel, in 1937.

Joaquín Torres-García was invited and sent a work to Paris for the exhibition Origines et développement de l’art international indépendant: De Cézanne à l’Art Non Figuratif, held at the Musée du Jeu de Paume from July 30 to October 31, 1937. Artists that participated included Matisse, Picasso, González, Miró, Mondrian, Kandinsky, Klee, Arp, Pevsner, Gabo, Hélion, etc.

In 1938 Torres-García began work on a pink granite monument for a park in the city of Montevideo called 'Monumento Cosmico', a representative work from this period.

=== 1940 ===
He gave more than 500 lectures between 1934 and 1940.

In 1941 he published A City with No Name and later that year presented a solo exhibition at the Society of Arquitects of Uruguay.

He was visited by Lincoln Kirstein, curator for the Committee of Inter-American Relations, and by Nelson A. Rockefeller.

He founded the Taller Torres-García, conceived along principles comparable to the European Bauhaus. Among its members were Olga Piria, Gonzalo Fonseca, José Gurvich, Alceu Ribeiro, Julio Alpuy, Raquel Orzuj, Lily Salvo, and his sons Horacio and Augusto.

During that time, he revisited the theme of maternity, which he had first explored in his 1914 Barcelona mural, creating a new piece for the Uruguayan Medical Association and completing seven large frescoes for the Saint Bois Hospital, a tuberculosis sanatorium.

Torres-García died on 8 August 1949 while preparing two exhibitions, one at the Sidney Janis Gallery in New York and another at the Pan American Union in Washington.

== Influences and legacy ==
Influenced by African art––as well as Oceanic and ancient Iberian art, his work moved steadily toward an abstract, structural language rooted in proportion, geometry, and universal form. Picasso, seven years his junior, followed closely the formal clarity and symbolic construction that Torres-García had already developed. Joan Miró studied with him in Barcelona and later openly credited his teacher's influence, especially in achieving a balance between structure and poetic expression. In the United States, Torres-García's constructive paintings—combining grid, symbol, and architecture—anticipated and helped shape the rise of American geometric abstraction, offering a model that bridged European modernism with a new transatlantic visual language. Many artists admired and studied his work, which was extensively exhibited in New York and Europe posthumously, such as Louise Nevelson, Adolph Gottlieb, and Barnett Newman.

== Major exhibitions ==
- 12 April – 29 June 2018, The Worlds of Joaquín Torres-Garcia, Acquavella Galleries, New York.
- 25 October 2015 – 15 February 2016, Joaquín Torres-García: the Arcadian modern, Museum of Modern Art, New York
- 29 December 2013 – 2 March 2014, Art & Textiles: fabric as material and concept in modern art from Klimt to the present, Kunstmuseum Wolfsburg, Germany
- 22 April 2013 – 30 June 2013, From Picasso to Barceló: Spanish Sculpture of the 20th Century, National Art Museum of China
- 16 May – 11 September 2011, Torres-García a les seves cruïlles (Torres-García at his Crossroads), Museu Nacional d'Art de Catalunya (MNAC), Barcelona
- 20 February – 30 May 2010, Joaquín Torres-García: Constructing Abstraction with Wood, the San Diego Museum of Art
- 27 March 2009, Trazos de Nueva York, Museo Torres-Garcia, Montevideo
- December 2008 – April 2009, Torres García a Vieira da Silva, 1929–1949, IVAM, Valencia, Museu Colecção Berardo, Portugal
- 8 October 2005 – 15 February 2006, Le feu sous les cendres : de Picasso à Basquiat, Fondation Dina Vierny-Musée Maillol, Paris
- 7 October 2005 – 19 February 2006, Obras maestras del siglo XX en las colecciones del IVAM, Valencia
- 25 November 2003 – 11 April 2004, Torres-Garcia, Museu Picasso, Barcelona
- 2003, Jean-Michel Basquiat-Gaston Chaissac-Jean Dubuffet-Joaquin Torres-Garcia, Jan Krugier Gallery, New York
- September 2002, From Puvis De Chavannes to Matisse and Picasso : Toward Modern Art, Palazzo Grassi, Venice
- 24 May – 8 September 2002, Joaquin Torres-Garcia : un monde construit : Musée d'art moderne et contemporain, Strasbourg
- 31 May – 23 August 1992 Joaquin Torres-Garcia en Theo van Doesburg, The Stedelijk Museum, Amsterdam

== Selected writings ==
- Augusta et Augusta, Barcelona, Universitat Catalana, 1904
- Dibujo educativo en el colegio Mont D'Or, Barcelona, 1907
- Notes sobre Art, Barcelona, 1913
- Diàlegs, 1914
- Descubrimiento de sí mismo, 1914
- Consells als artistes, Barcelona, Un enemic del poble, 1917
- Em digué tot aixó, Barcelona, La Revista, 1917
- D'altra orbita, Barcelona, Un enemic del poble, 1917
- Devem Caminar, Barcelona, Un enemic del poble, 1917
- Art-Evolució, Barcelona, Un enemic del poble, 1917
- El Públic i les noves tendéncies d'art, Barcelona, Velli nou, 1918
- Plasticisme, Barcelona, Un Enemic del poble, 1918
- Natura i Art, Barcelona, Un Enemic del poble, 1918
- L'Art en relació al home etern i l'home que passa, Sitges, Imprenta El eco de Sitges. 1919
- La Regeneració de si mateix, Barcelona, Salvat Papasseit Editor, 1919
- Poemes en ondes hertzianes, 1919 (illustrator)
- Foi, París, 1930
- Ce que je sais, et ce que je fais par moi-même, Losones, Suiza, 1930
- Pére soleil, París, Fundación Torres García, 1931
- Raison et nature, Ediciones Imán, París, 1932
- Estructura, Montevideo, 1935
- De la tradición andina: Arte precolombino, Montevideo, Círculo y cuadrado, 1936
- Manifiesto 2: Constructivo 100 %, Montevideo, Asociación de Arte Constructivo, 1938
- La tradición del hombre abstracto (Doctrina constructivista). Montevideo, 1938
- Historia de mi vida. Montevideo, 1939
- Metafísica de la prehistoria indoamericana, Montevideo, Asociación de Arte Constructivo, 1939
- Manifiesto 3, Montevideo, Asociación de Arte Constructivo, 1940
- La ciudad sin nombre. Montevideo, Uruguay, Asociación de Arte Constructivo, 1942
- Universalismo Constructivo, Montevideo, 1944
- Con respecto a una futura creación literaria y dos poemas, Divertimento 1 y Divertimento 11, Montevideo, Revista Arturo, 1944
- La decoración mural del pabellón Martirené de la colonia Saint Bois. Montevideo, Gráficas Sur, 1944
- En defensa de las expressiones modernas del arte, Montevideo, 1944
- Nueva escuela de arte de Uruguay. Montevideo, Asociación de Arte Constructivo, 1946
- La regla abstracta. Montevideo, Asociación de Arte Constructivo, 1946
- Mística de la pintura, Montevideo, 1947
- Lo aparente y lo concreto en el arte, Montevideo, 1948
- La recuperación del objeto, Montevideo, 1948

== Bibliography ==
- Joaquim Torres i García; Estherde Cáceres, Carmelo de Arzadum, Alfredo Cáceres, Pablo Purriel, Juan R. Menchaca, i Guido Castillo, the decoration mural of the Martirené pavilion of the colony Saint Bois. Murals paintings of pavilion J.J. Martirené Hospital of the colony Saint Bois. South graphs. Montevideo, 1944.
- Claude Schaefer, Joaquin Torres García. Ed. Poseidón. Library Argentina de Arte. Buenos Aires, 1949.
- Josep Francesc Ràfols, Biographical Dictionary of artists of Catalonia. Torres-Garcia, Joaquin, Volume III, p. 153. Barcelona, Milà, 1966.
- Daniel Robbins, Joaquin Torrers-Garcia, 1874–1949. Ed. by Museum of Art Rhode Island School of Design. Providence, 1970. ISBN 0-911517-23-5
- Enric Jardí, Torres García. Editorial Polígrafa, S. A., Balmes, 54 – 08007, Barcelona, 1973. ISBN 84-343-0180-6
- Jacques Lassaigne, Ángel Kalenberg, Maria Helena Vieira da Silva, Michel Seuphor, Jean Hélion, Torres-Garcia. Construction et Symbols. Published by the Museum of Modern Art of Villa of Paris. Catalogue of the exhibition made between June and August 1975. Paris, 1975.
- Jacques Lassaigne, Torres-Garcia. Works destroyed in the fire of the museum of modern art of Rio de Janeiro, Published by the Torres Foundation Garci'a. Montevideo, Uruguay. 1981.
- Margit Rowell, Theo van Doesburg, Joaquín Torres-García, Torres Garcia Structure. Paris-Montevideo 1924–1944 Edited by Foundation Joan Miró. Catalogue of the exhibition in the Fundació Joan Miró, Parc de Montjuic in March 1986. Barcelona, 1986.
- Ángel Kalenberg, Seis Maestros De La Pintura Uruguaya: Juan Manuel Blanes, Carlos Federico Saez, Pedro Figari, Joaquin Torres García, Rafael Barradas y José Cúneo. Edited by Museo Nacional de Bellas Artes de Buenos Aires. Catálogo de la exposición realizada entre Septiembre y Octubre de 1987. Avda. del Libertador, 1473. Buenos Aires, 1987. Montevideo, 1987.
- Alicia Haber, Joaquin Torres Garci'a. Eternal Catalonia. Sketches and drawings for the fresh airs of the Delegation of Barcelona. Edited by Foundation Torres García. Montevideo, 1988.
- María Jesús García Puig, Joaquin Torres Garcia and the Constructive Universalismo: The education of the art in Uruguay. Editions of Hispanic culture. Collection Art. Madrid, 1990. ISBN 84-7232-558-X
- Jorge Castle, Nicolette Gast, Eduardo Lipschutz-Villa, and Sebastián López, The antagonistic Link. Joaquin Torres Garcia-Theo van Doesburg. Published by Institute of Contemporary Art. Ámsterdam, 1991.
- Pilar Garcia-Sedas, Joaquin Torres the Striped Garcias and Rafael. Dialeg escrit: 1918–1928. Publicacions of l' Abbey of Montserrat. Barcelona, 1994. ISBN 84-7826-531-7
- Joan Sureda Pons, Narcís [Narciso], Comadira and Mercedes Doñate, Torres Garcia: Pintures de Mon Repos, Published by the Museum of modern Art of the Museum of Art of Catalunya and the Caixa of Terrassa. I catalogue of the exhibition that place in the museum of modern art of the MNAC took, and in the Cultural Foundation of the Caixa of Terrassa. Barcelona, January 1995.
- Pilar García-Sedas, Joaquim Torres Garcia. Epistolari Català: 1909–1936. Curial Edicions Catalan. Publicacions of l' Abbey of Montserrat, Barcelona, 1997. ISBN 84-7826-839-1
- Joan Sureda Pons, Torres Garcia. Classic passion. Akal editions/contemporary Art. Number 5. Madrid, 1998. ISBN 84-460-0814-9
- Carlos Pérez, Pilar Garcia-Sedas, Mario H. Gradowczyk and Emilio Ellena, Aladdin Toys. Them joguines of Torres Garcia. Published by the IVAM. I catalogue of the exhibition that took place in the Valencian Institute of Modern Art in September 1998.
- Miguel Angel Battegazzore, the plot and the signs, Impresora Gordon, S.A. Av. General Rondeau 2485, Montevideo, 1999.
- Gabriel Peluffo Linari, History of the Uruguayan painting. Editions of Eastern band limited liability company. Gaboto 1582. Montevideo 11200. Uruguay, 1999 imaginary Tomo the 1 National-regional (1830–1930) from Blanes to Figari Tomo 2 Between localismo and universalismo: Representations of modernity (1930–1960).
- Michael Peppiatt, Jean-Michel Basquiat - Gaston Chaissac - Jean Dubuffet - Joaquin Torres-Garcia, New York, catalogue of the exhibition that took place in Jan Krugier Gallery, 2003.
- Tomàs Llorens, Emmanuel Guigon, J.Torres-Garcia Un monde construit, Hazan, Strasbourg, 2002, catalogue of the exhibition that took place in Musée d'Art Moderne et Contemporain de Strasbourg, 24 May to September 2002.ISBN 2-85025-827-X
- Tomàs Llorens, Emmanuel Guigon, Juan José Lahuerta, J. Torres-Garcia, Editorial Ausa y Institut de Cultura de Barcelona, Barcelona, 2003, catalogue of the exhibition that took place in Museo Picasso de Barcelona, 25 November to 11 April 2004.ISBN 84-88810-63-6
- Nicolás Arocena Armas, Eric Corne, Marina Bairrão, Emmanuel Guigon, Domitille D'Orgeval, La ituicion y la Estructura, Lisboa, Museo Coleccao Berardo, 2008.ISBN 978-84-482-5105-5
- Tomás Llorens, Nicolás Arocena Armas, Torres-Garcia a les seves cruilles-Torres-Garcia en sus encrucijadas. Barcelona, Spain: Museu Nacional d'Art de Catalunya 2011.
- Llorens, Tomas. Arocena Armas, Nicolas, J.Torres-Garcia, New York, Joaquin Torres-Garcia Archive, 2011. Notes
