= Museo Torres García =

Art museum

Coordinates: 34°54′23.4″S 56°12′05″W

Torres García Museum Museo Torres García
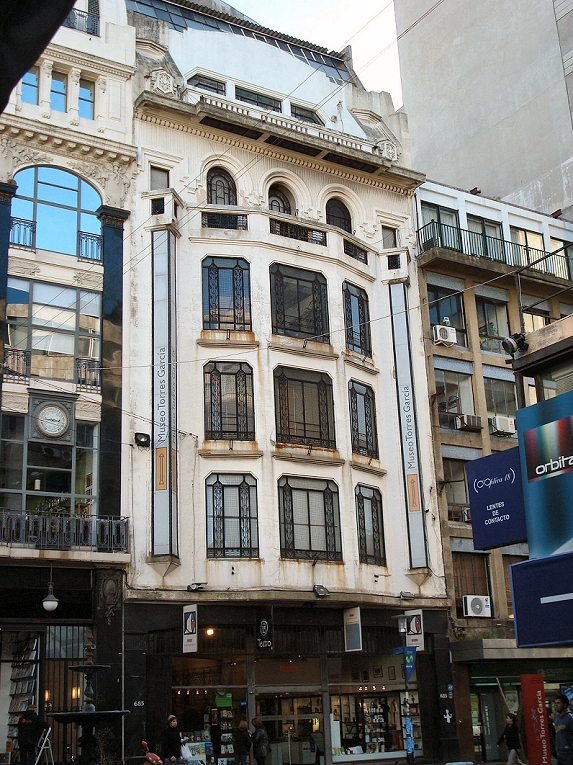
- Established: 1949
- Location: Montevideo, Uruguay
- Type: Municipal
- Director: Alejandro Diaz
- Website: www.torresgarcia.org.uy

The Museo Torres García is located in the historic Ciudad Vieja (Old Town) of Montevideo where unusual portraits of historical icons and cubist paintings akin to Picasso's paintings, painted by Joaquín Torres García are exhibited. The museum was established by Manolita Piña Torres, the widow of Torres Garcia after his death in 1949 who also set up the García Torres Foundation, a private non-profit organization which organizes the paintings, drawings, original writings, archives, objects and furniture designed by the painter as well as the photographs, magazines and publications related to him.

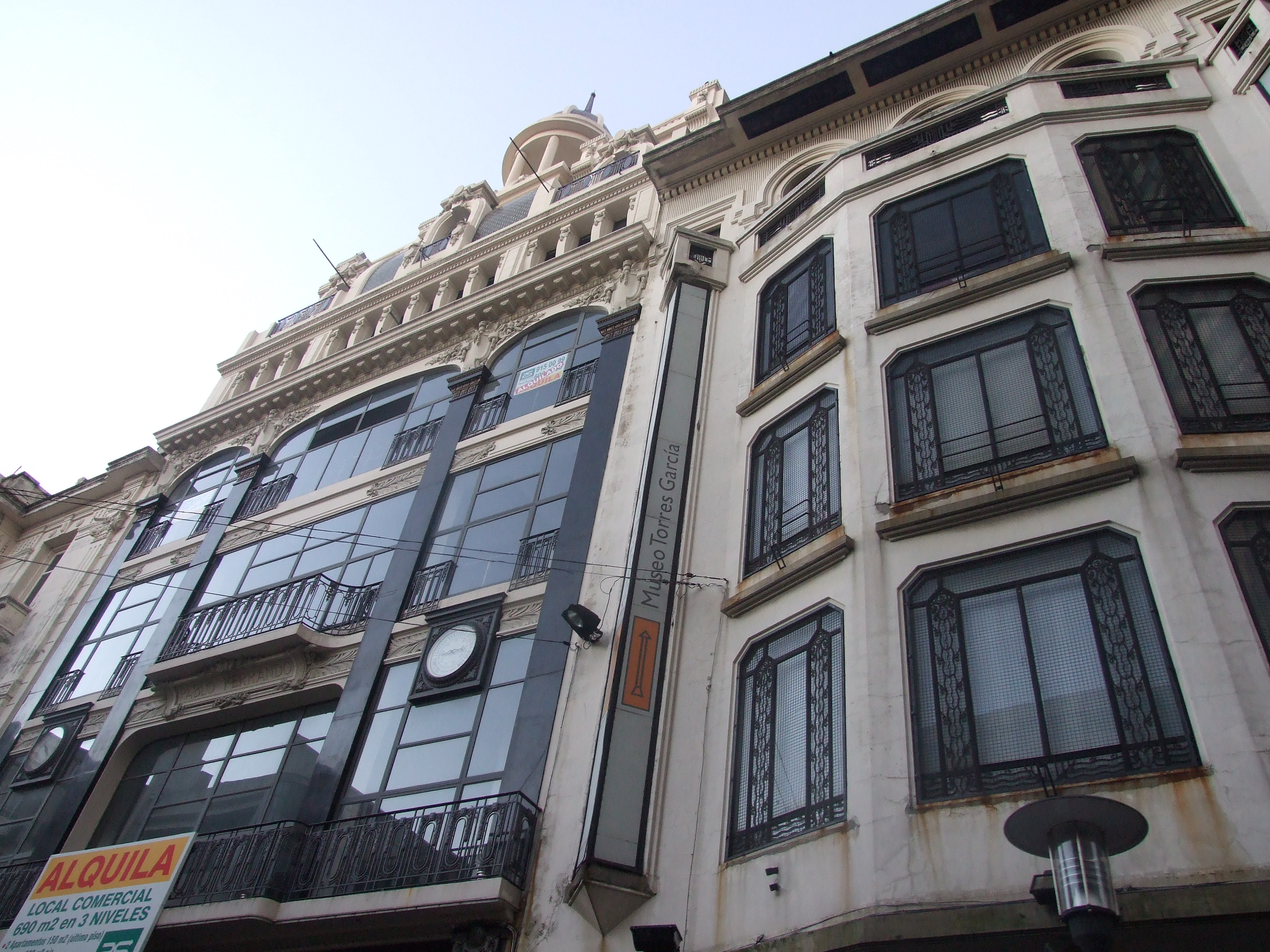
Museo Torres García

The museum attracts over 85,000 visitors a year, not only for its exhibits but also because it functions as a temporary library (on the ground floor) and as a theatre (in the basement) and attracts a significant number of art students, school children, and tourists with guided tours and educational workshops. The museum has seven floors, with the first three floors used as exhibition space and the upper floors for educational activities and art workshops.

In 2009, a retrospective of the work of the ceramicist Eva Díaz Torres' was held at the museum.

== See also ==
- List of museums in Uruguay
