= Stanisław Eleszkiewicz =

Polish painter and draftsman

- Born: 1900
- Died: 1963 (aged 62–63)
- Occupations: Painter, draftsman

Stanisław Eleszkiewicz (1900–1963) was a Polish painter and draftsman.

Eleszkievicz was born in Ukraine and raised in Warsaw. In 1912, he attended the School of Fine Arts in Mirgorod. In 1918, the enlisted in the Poltaw cavalry branch. In 1923, after living in Russia, Athens and Naples, he moved to Paris. From 1927 until 1945, he worked with the famous stained glass designer Jean Gaudin.
