= Manolita Piña =

Uruguayan artist (1883–1994)

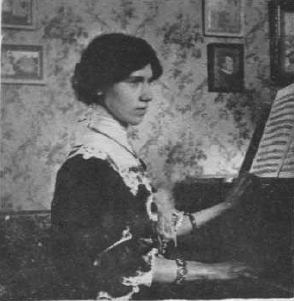
- Born: Manolita Piña Rubies; 24 February 1883; Barcelona, Catalonia, Kingdom of Spain
- Died: 11 June 1994 (aged 111 years, 107 days); Montevideo, Uruguay
- Occupations: Pianist; painter
- Spouse: Joaquín Torres García (m. 1908; died 1949)
- Children: Olimpia Torres; Horacio Torres; Augusto Torres; Ifigenia Torres

Manolita Piña Torres-García (née Piña Rubies; 24 February 1883 – 11 June 1994) was a Spanish pianist and painter, and the wife of Spanish-Uruguayan painter Joaquín Torres García.

== Biography ==
She was born into an upper-class catalan Barcelona family, where she received a traditional education. She was the daughter of the merchant Jaume Piña i Segura, born in Palma (1830–1902), and Mercè de Rubies de Balaguer. She had a sister, Carolina, and a brother, Santiago, who was a respected scientist. Largely self-taught in art, she was noted for her refinement and artistic culture in a brief article published in the magazine Feminal in 1907, which reproduced three of her small drawings. She was also a talented pianist.

She married Joaquín Torres García on 20 August 1909 in Barcelona. They had four children together. She and her husband lived throughout Europe, including in Terrassa at the villa of Mon Repos from 1914 to 1919, and then traveled to Brussels, Paris, and then New York City in the United States. She returned to Europe to live in Italy, specifically Genoa and then Fiesole in 1922, and then moved to Paris in 1926, where she settled with Torres García until 1932, when she moved to Madrid. In April 1934, she settled in Montevideo, Uruguay. From Uruguay, she supported her husband's activities, which included conferences, exhibitions, and his goal of forming a Constructivist Art School.

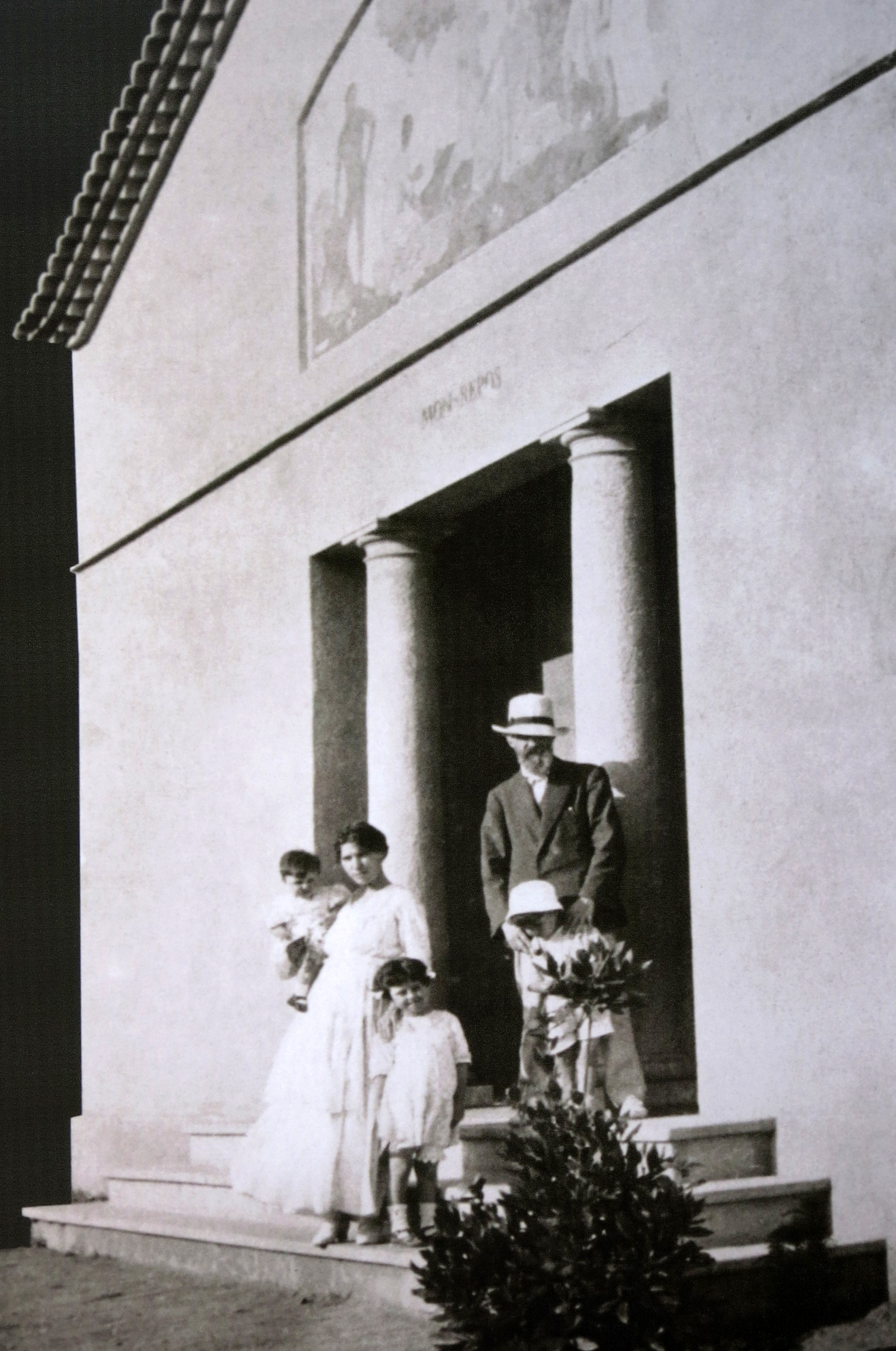
Manolita Piña and family, 1916

Manolita had met Torres in 1905 when he gave drawing classes, initially to her sister, at their home. Much later, during an interview with María Esther Gilio in 1984, she joked that she stopped painting so that she would not become a better painter than her husband. She felt that although she had stopped painting herself, that her opinion on art was always welcome.

After her husband's death in 1949, Manolita wanted to create a museum to preserve and promote his art. This would lead to the inauguration of the Torres García Museum (Museo Torres García) in 1953.

She died at the age of 111 on June 11, 1994, being the oldest person in Uruguay at the time of her death.

== Legacy ==
In 1951, Piña Torres created a group in Montevideo, called MAOTIMA (standing for the names of the participants, Manolita, Otilia, Iphigenia, and Maria Angelica) which was dedicated to working on embroidered tapestries.

Piña Torres felt that after her husband's death in 1949, she should ensure his legacy and therefore created a museum dedicated to her husband's art and legacy, which she accomplished at age 106. Piña Torres set up the foundation to support the Museo Torres Garcia and helped found the museum, which was initially opened on 29 July 1953. The museum went through a long, difficult history until the government of Uruguay stabilized and the museum was inaugurated in its current form in 1986. Piña Torres was credited for the enthusiasm and strength of her work towards the museum's creation.

She was often a subject of portraiture for her husband and the subject of others' paintings, as well, including work by artist Rafael Barradas.

She was posthumously honored in 2000 by the Cultural Center Foundation, Caixa Terrassa.
