= Albert Bockstael =

Belgian artist (1898–1989)

- Born: 9 September 1898; Anderlecht, Belgium
- Died: 21 January 1945 (aged 85); Wommelgem, Belgium
- Education: Royal Academy of Fine Arts
- Known for: Painting

Albert Bockstael (Anderlecht, September 9, 1898 – Wommelgem, November 18, 1989) was a Belgian artist active as a painter, illustrator, poet, and philosopher.

Bockstael initially created expressionist works. Later on he explored a more magical realistic substyle. Eventually his work transformed into his unique genre named by art critics: "The poetic and mystical realism of Bockstael".

== Biography ==
Albert Bockstael was born in 1898 in Anderlecht, a Brussels municipality. He lived several years with his grandfather, Emile Bockstael, a famous Belgian politician who was Alderman and Mayor of Laeken for almost half a century.

Bockstael studied at the Royal Academy of Fine Arts, Brussels from 1915. Fellow students at that time were surrealists, René Magritte and Victor Servranckx, with whom he became friends.

He painted in an expressionistic manner, which was considered by P. De Hasse to be the highlight of his mature period. This was also the period when World War I was waging and Brussels was taken over by an occupation regime.

At the age of twenty Bockstael was put in civil captivity in Diest in 1918.

After World War I he travelled the world for a couple of years as a sailor. At last Antwerp became his new hometown. He married Palmyre Bockstael and together they raised four children. He had his creative studio next to the Rupel, a river in Belgium. Where he could create and contemplate from a distance of the business of the city.

Although his style was initially expressionistic, Bockstael developed his techniques further under the influence of surrealism and symbolism. Later on combined with realism and poetic elements.

He became part of the Groupe d'Art Moderne de Liège (1920–1940), founded by his friend and poet Georges Linze.

Les insensés sont passés, tout est détruit: mais les cerises ont mûri. Couverte de son manteau de cendre noire, la Veuve Eternelle chemine. Tel un Parthénon étrange, des ruines calcinées se dressent sur la colline. Malgré le sacrilège, le monde retrouvera sa beauté.

— Albert Bockstael, over zijn werk Sacrilège

Once again peace was disturbed by World War II. Bockstael became a prisoner of war of the Nazis in Germany from May to December 1940, in Neubrandenburg, Greifswald en Altwarp. The impact of this period can be seen in much of his work.

So after this war, his style developed through surrealism in a more mystical and poetic direction. His work becomes more of a celebration of daily life and freedom. This can be felt in his books like La Belle Journée.

Around that period Bockstael became friends with many writers and philosophers like Achille Chavée, Moirant, Paul Neuhuys, Geert van Bruaenen en Georges-Marie Matthijs. The latter described him as "aloof prophet and idealistic painter". Bockstael began writing poems and articles for magazines with a socially critical lens, like the magazine Anthologie directed by Georges Linze and Tribune.

Albert Bockstael died in 1989 at the age of 91 in Wommelgem, Antwerp.

== Selected list of works ==
=== Visual Arts ===
Paintings

- 1933 Rupelmonde, oil on canvas, 122 × 112 cm
- 1950 The Returned Peace
- 1953 The Table and the Kingdom of Demons
- 1952 The Storm
- 1952 The Garden
- 1954 Painting of a naked girl in nature
- 1955 Mobilization
- 1959 Tower of Babel: This work gives Bockstael's own vision on the Tower of Babel. It's a very complex and detailed work of art. In the painting there's a huge space with heaven and earth. He depicts war and lust for power and the end of life values in dark tones. The orange sun shines its rays on a walled garden with sunflowers and a garden table: this scene represents quiet, safe happiness far away from the violence of the world.
- 1973 Commedia Umana
- The carrousel
- His Last Snow
- The Madonna of Antwerp
- Title unknown

Illustrations

- Problème d'un Art Nouveau, Anthologie n^{o} 4, G. Linze, illustration by A. Bockstael, "Le jeune homme et les bonnes bêtes", 1939
- Carrefour, 1941 Jean Barthou, et al.; illustrated by Albert Bockstael, et al. Paris: Editions de la Cité moderne, 1941
- Cormidor, Jules Gille, illustrations by Albert Bockstael, 1943
- Chansons Bohèmes, Jean Boon, illustrations by Albert Bockstael, 1944
- Andante Amoroso, Jean Boon, illustrations by Albert Bockstael, 1944
- Les Savoyardes, André Sarmate, illustrations by Albert Bockstael, 1952
- Au Bout de la Route: Poemes et Prefaces, foreword by R. Moirant; A. Jaumotte, et al. illustrations by A. Bockstael, et al, 1965
- L'oiseau inquiet. Poetic manifest / Edmond-Luc Dumoulin; foreword by Edouard Herriot; illustrations by Laurent Larose, Georges Comhaire, Léonide Frechkop, Albert Bockstael et Géo Hertay
- Les Memoires de Dieulepere, Moirant, foreword by G. Linze, illustrations by A. Bockstael, Editions Malgrétout, Brussel, 1974
- A Cheval de l'Amateur au Professionnel, E. De Loménie, cover illustrated by A. Bockstael, Editions Malgrétout, Brussel, 1974

Drawings

- 1955 City Life, pencil
- 1965 Silencium, ink on paper
- 1975 Past Vision of the Future, pencil and Indian ink

Lithographies

- 1964 Mother and Daughter

Poetry

- 1968 Poem of the pure and impure world, screen printed and colored by hand

=== Publications ===
- La Belle Journée, Albert Bockstael; foreword by J.-P. Bonnami, Editions l'Horizon Nouveau, Luik 1942
- Ami notre Bonheur, Albert Bockstael, Editions Wastiau-Jeukens, Brussels 1976

Other

- 1958: Artdirector for the movie Quelqu'un frappe à la porte by Alexandre Szombati.

== Selected exhibitions ==
Throughout his life, Bockstael held more than 130 exhibitions at home and abroad.

Some examples:

- 1951 - Exposition, La Galerie Saint-Laurent, Luik
- 1974 - Rétrospective Albert Bockstael
- 1978 - 7 x Antwerp, Museum for Religious Art, Ostend.
- 1983 - Albert Bockstael - Master of Poetic and Mystical Realism, at Huis Hellemans, Edegem. A book, written by Bockstael himself, has also been published to accompany this exhibition.

== Documentary ==
1961 - Visiting Albert Bockstael, documentary by B.R.T.

== Footnotes and references ==
=== Bibliography ===
- Candau, Leon, ed. (March 1993). "De onvolprezen kunstschilder Albert BOCKSTAEL was de kleinzoon van burgemeester BOCKSTAEL" [The unsurpassed painter Albert BOCKSTAEL was the grandson of mayor BOCKSTAEL] (PDF). Laca Tijdingen (in Dutch). 4 (3). Albert Bockstael, artist: 3–7. Archived (PDF) from the original on 2021-09-30.
- Caso, Paul (18 November 1989). "Mort du peintre Albert Bockstael". Le Soir Plus (in French). Archived from the original on 26 October 2021.
- Ehlers, Tim, ed. (March–April 2009). "Auf den Spuren belgischer Künstler in Deutschland" [On the trail of Belgian artists in Germany]. Nachbar Belgien (in German). No. 2. p. 8. Archived from the original on 2021-10-26.
- Materna, Dietmar (2011). "Kunst und Kriegsgefangenschaft - Der belgische Künstler Albert Bockstael im Kriegsjahr 1940 in Mecklenburg und Pommern" [Art and Prisoner of War - The Belgian artist Albert Bockstael in the war year 1940 in Mecklenburg and Pomerania]. In Lichtnau, Bernfried (ed.). Bildende Kunst in Mecklenburg und Pommern von 1880 bis 1950: Kunstprozesse zwischen Zentrum und Peripherie [Visual arts in Mecklenburg and Pomerania from 1880 to 1950: Art processes between center and periphery] (in German). Lukas Verlag. pp. 365–377. ISBN 9783867320610.
- Neeff, Martha. "Bockstael, Albert". Dictionnaire des Peintres belges (in French). Archived from the original on 2021-09-17.
