= Cimitero Monumentale di Milano =

Cemetery in Milan, Italy

Cimitero Monumentale di Milano Monumental Cemetery of Milan
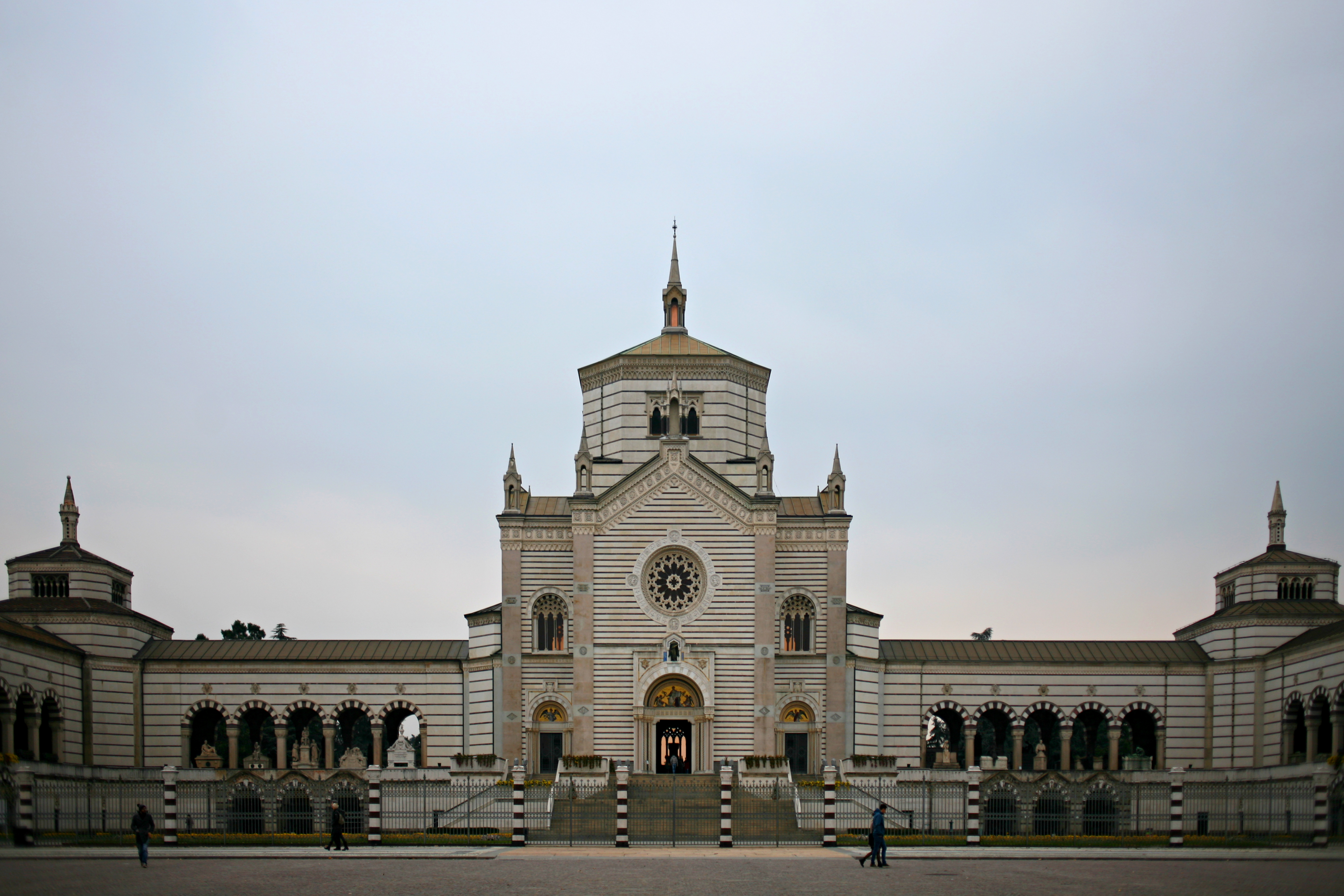
- Main entrance
- Interactive map of Cimitero Monumentale di Milano; Monumental Cemetery of Milan

Details
- Established: 1 January 1867
- Location: Milan
- Country: Italy
- Coordinates: 45°29′09″N 9°10′45″E
- Type: Non-denominational
- Owned by: City of Milan
- Size: 25 hectares (62 acres)
- Website: Monumental Cemetery

The Cimitero Monumentale (Italian: [tʃimiˈtɛːro monumenˈtaːle]; "Monumental Cemetery") is one of the two largest cemeteries in Milan, Italy, the other one being the Cimitero Maggiore. It is noted for the abundance of artistic tombs and monuments.

Designed by the architect Carlo Maciachini, it was planned to consolidate a number of small cemeteries that used to be scattered around the city into a single location.

Officially opened in 1866, it has since then been filled with a wide range of contemporary and classical Italian sculptures as well as Greek temples, elaborate obelisks, and other original works such as a scaled-down version of the Trajan's Column. Many of the tombs belong to noted industrialist dynasties, and were designed by artists such as Adolfo Wildt, Giò Ponti, Arturo Martini, Agenore Fabbri, Lucio Fontana, Medardo Rosso, Giacomo Manzù, Floriano Bodini, and Giò Pomodoro.

The main entrance is through the large Famedio, a massive Hall of Fame-like Neo-Medieval style building made of marble and stone that contains the tombs of some of the city's and the country's most honored citizens, including that of novelist Alessandro Manzoni.

The Civico Mausoleo Palanti designed by the architect Mario Palanti is a tomb built for meritorious "Milanesi", or citizens of Milan. The memorial of about 800 Milanese killed in Nazi concentration camps is located in the center and is the work of the group BBPR, formed by leading exponents of Italian rationalist architecture that included Gianluigi Banfi.

The cemetery has a special section for those who do not belong to the Catholic religion and a Jewish section.

Near the entrance there is a permanent exhibition of prints, photographs, and maps outlining the cemetery's historical development. It includes two battery-operated electric hearses built in the 1920s.

== History ==
=== Planning ===
The Famedio, about 1890

In 1837 the municipal council of Milan, led by the podestà Gabrio Casati, decided to hold a competition for a new cemetery that would be "worthy of the splendour of Milan" and large enough for all the city's dead. The aim was to replace the many small cemeteries scattered around the city with a single large one.

The competition offered a site of 55,200 square metres (13.6 acres) at the Cascine Abbadesse, outside Porta Comasina. Twenty-five designs were submitted by June 1839. Opinion was divided between the designs of Alessandro Sidoli and Giulio Aluisetti, and the Brera Academy of Fine Arts judged in favour of Sidoli. On 12 August 1843, however, the city council set the competition aside and asked Aluisetti to prepare a new design, which it approved on 4 September 1846.

Doubts about the site, including fears that it would pollute drinking water, were settled by a report from the chemist Antonio Kramer. Even so, on 10 March 1847 the Austrian authorities refused to approve the cost and asked for a new design on a different site. The events of 1848 then halted the project.

The question was reopened in 1855. After the deaths of both Sidoli and Aluisetti, the city asked the engineer Pestagalli to adapt Aluisetti's design to a new site between Porta Comasina and Porta Tenaglia, where the cemetery stands today. Work began on levelling the ground and building the boundary wall. On 20 May 1860, after Milan had been freed from Austrian rule, the new city council stopped the work. The main reason given was that the walled area was too small. Writing in 1894, the architect Luca Beltrami also pointed to a wish to drop a project that dated from the years of foreign rule, and whose Greco-Roman style had gone out of fashion.

A new competition, for a cemetery of 180,000 square metres (44 acres), closed at the end of December 1861 with 28 entries. No design was chosen outright, and in July 1862 the council asked the authors of the five best designs, including Carlo Maciachini, to submit new ones. On 10 July 1863 Maciachini's design was judged the best, and it was finally approved on 22 December 1863. In his final design Maciachini combined Lombard forms with Byzantine elements.

=== Opening and growth ===
The cemetery was blessed by Monsignor Giuseppe Calvi on 2 November 1866, in the presence of the mayor, Antonio Beretta. The first burial, on the same day, was that of the composer Gustavo Adolfo Noseda, whose remains were moved from the cemetery of Porta Magenta. Noseda had died of tuberculosis at the age of 27, shortly before he was due to make his debut at La Scala. Sixteen more burials took place before 1 January 1867, the date from which burials continued without interruption. The buildings were still unfinished at the time.

The boundary wall was completed in 1870, and the central ossuary, which then had a Catholic chapel above it, in 1873. The Famedio was completed in 1887. The cemetery was later enlarged several times and now covers about 250,000 square metres (62 acres).

== Layout and architecture ==
Detail of the entrance arcades

The entrance forecourt, at the end of Via Ceresio, covers about 5,000 square metres (54,000 sq ft). The plan is symmetrical and laid out at right angles around the central entrance court. The main building is decorated with horizontal bands of stone from Val Camonica and Sarnico, with inserts of stone from Viggiù, and the colonnades leading to the side galleries are of white and pink granite from Baveno. Arcades called Gallerie run east and west from the central building and connect it to the Edicole, raised polygonal buildings where the arcades meet.

A central avenue runs the length of the cemetery and divides it into two symmetrical halves. It passes the central ossuary and the Necropolis and ends at the crematorium. The crematorium is 625 metres (2,051 ft) from the entrance gate. Separate sections with their own entrances were set aside for non-Catholics on the west side and for the Jewish community on the east side.

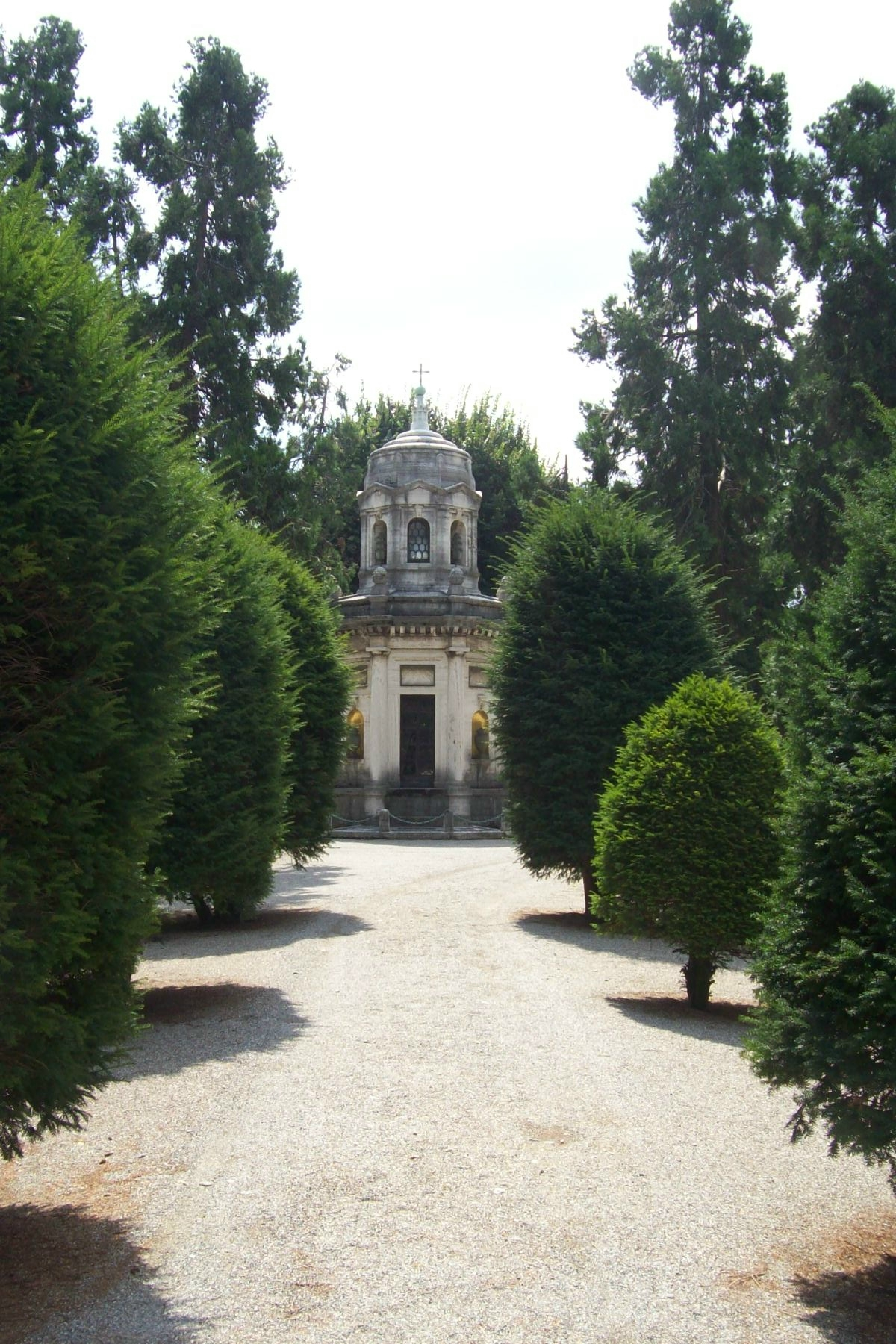
A tree-lined avenue inside the cemetery

=== Famedio ===
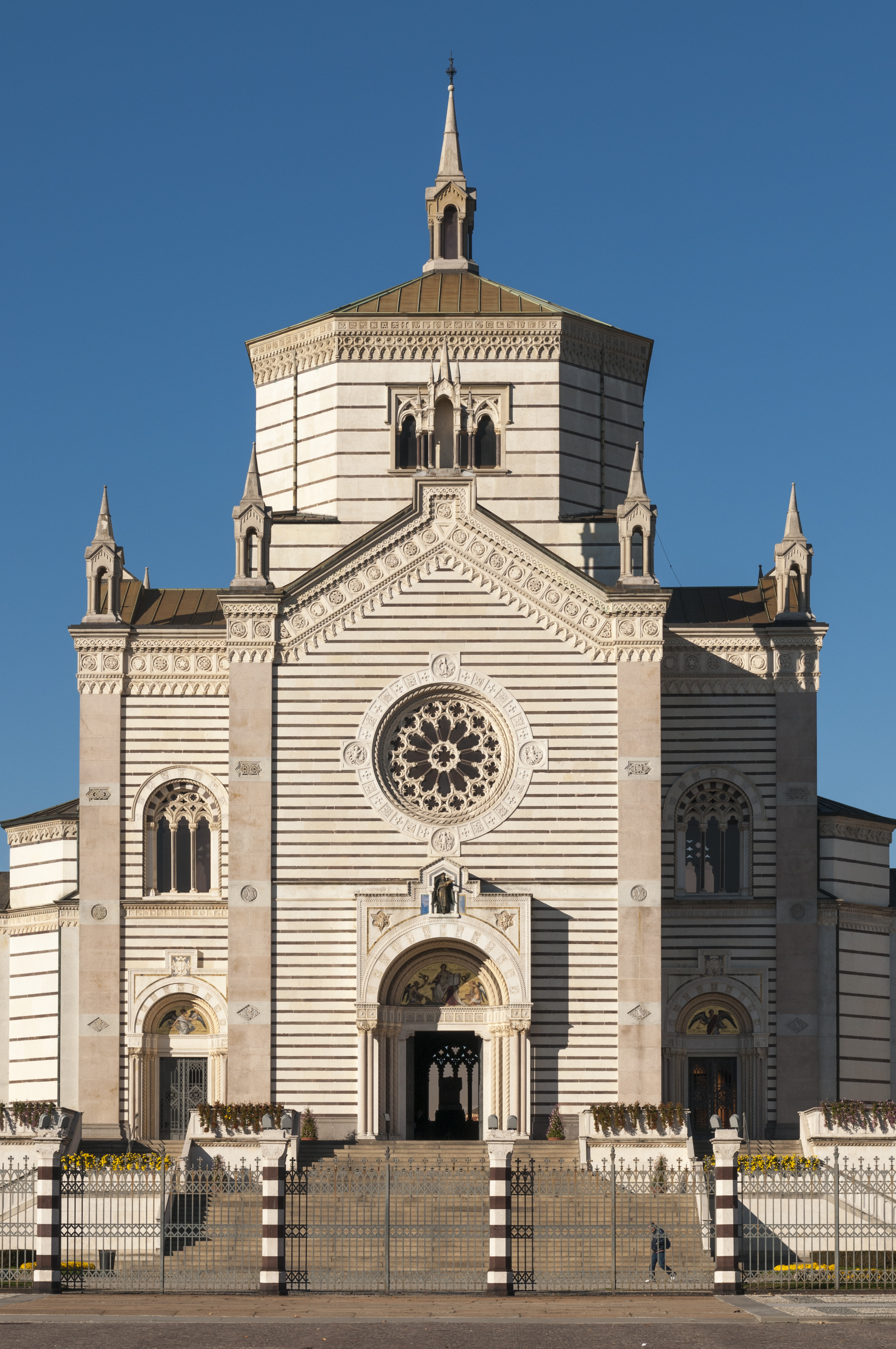
The Famedio

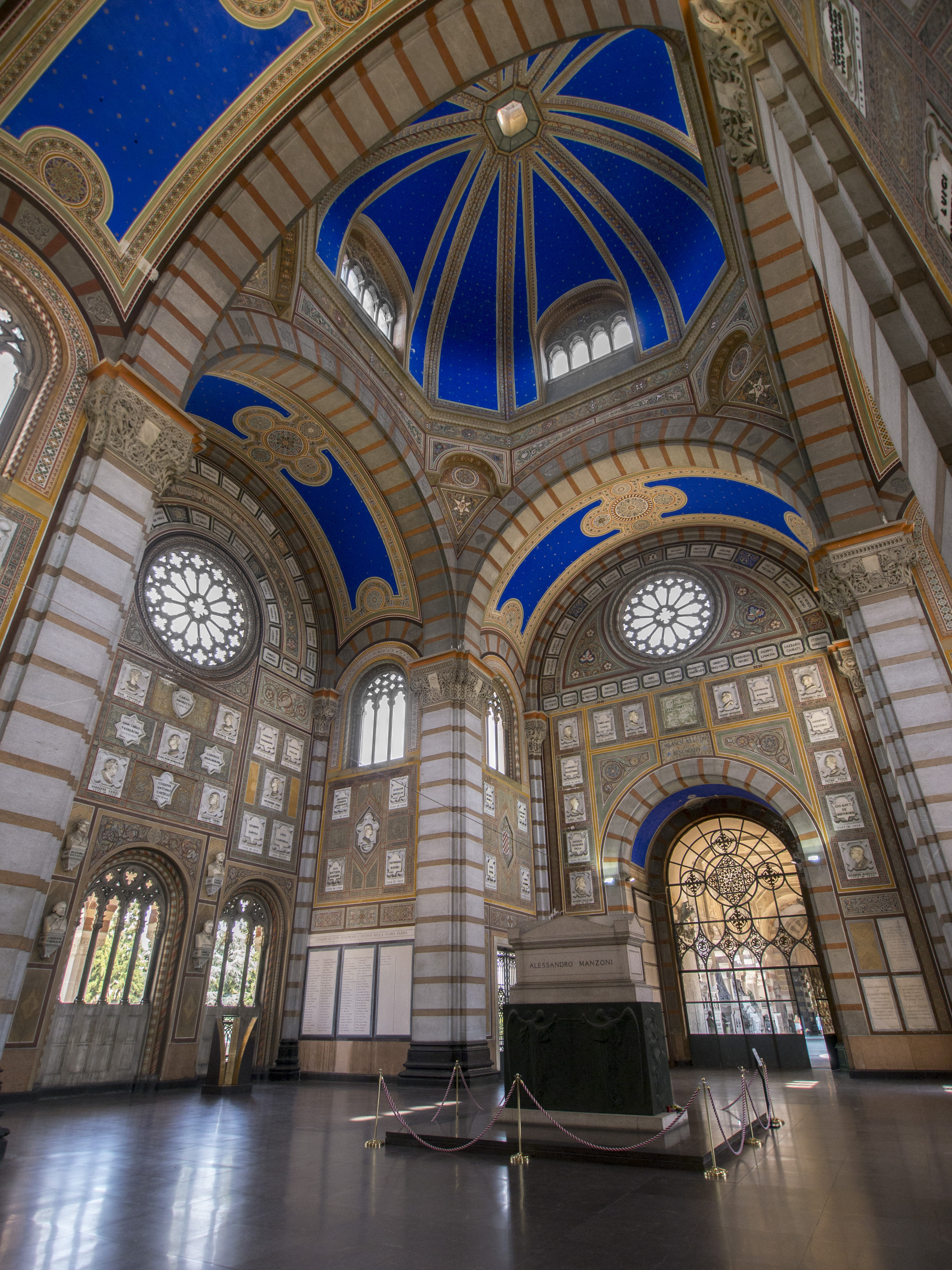
Interior of the Famedio, with the tomb of Alessandro Manzoni at the centre

The Famedio ("temple of fame") stands at the centre of the front of the cemetery, facing the entrance court. Maciachini designed it as a Catholic chapel, but in 1869–1870 it was set aside for the burial and memory of people from Milan, by birth or adoption, who had brought distinction to the city and to Italy. The exterior is in Maciachini's neo-medieval eclectic style, with a large Gothic-style rose window over the main entrance. The interior was decorated between 1884 and 1887 by a team that included the painter Luigi Cavenaghi and the decorators Angelo and Celso Stocchetti, with painted floral and geometric patterns, memorial plaques and portrait reliefs. Lodovico Pogliaghi later designed the mosaics in the lunettes over the three doors, showing allegories of Light, History and Fame.

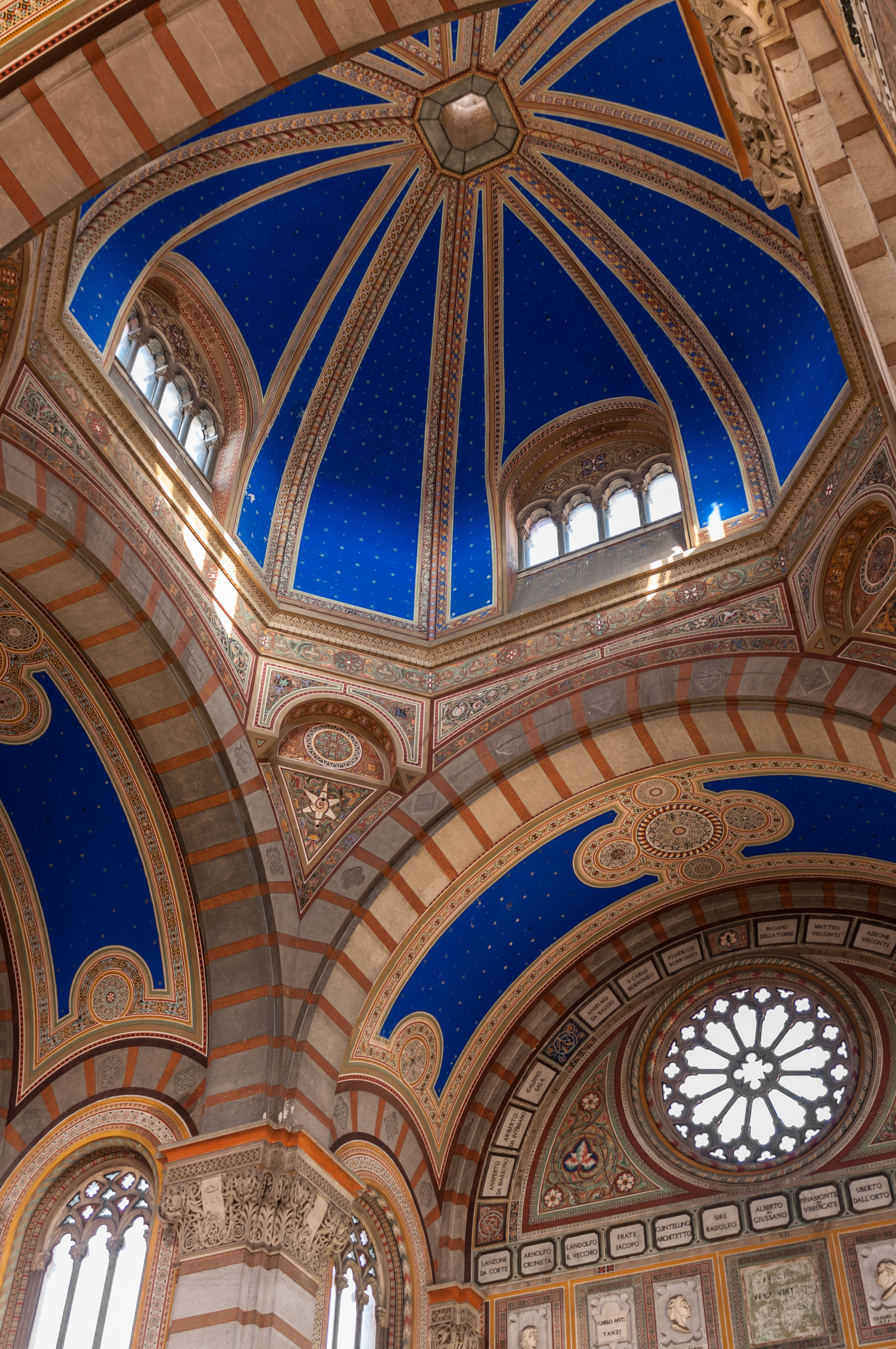
Vault of the Famedio

Rules drawn up in 1884, and partly revised in 1904, set out three groups of people to be honoured there: the "illustrious", for achievements in literature, art or science; the "meritorious", who had benefited the city; and those "distinguished in national history". A person does not need to be buried in the Famedio to be honoured there. Many of those named on its plaques are buried elsewhere in the cemetery, such as Arturo Toscanini, and some are buried in other places, such as Giuseppe Verdi, at the Casa di Riposo per Musicisti in Milan, and Giuseppe Mazzini, at the Staglieno cemetery in Genoa. New names are unveiled each year at a ceremony on 2 November attended by the mayor. In 2016 sixteen names were added, including those of Umberto Eco and Krizia.

Only eight people are buried in the Famedio itself. Alessandro Manzoni, the first to be moved there, in 1883, ten years after his death, lies at the centre in a sarcophagus designed by Maciachini. Carlo Cattaneo and Luca Beltrami lie in the other two sarcophagi in the hall. Salvatore Quasimodo, Carlo Forlanini, Bruno Munari and Leo Valiani are in columbaria on the west side, and Carla Fracci has been in a columbarium on the east side since 2021. Beltrami, who died in 1933, was first buried at Cireggio, near Omegna, and was moved to the Famedio in 1985. The historian Cesare Cantù was buried in the cemetery after his death in 1895, but was moved to his birthplace, Brivio, in 1905.

The crypt beneath the Famedio is entered from the entrance arcades. Those buried there include Aldo Aniasi, Guido Crepax, Dario Fo and Franca Rame, Ambrogio Fogar, Giorgio Gaber, Paolo Grassi, Enzo Jannacci, Duilio Loi, Alda Merini and Giovanni Raboni.

Besides the Famedio, the city uses other tombs in the cemetery to honour notable citizens. The Civico Mausoleo Garbin was built in 1896 for the Ursuline Sisters of Milan and passed to the Garbin family in 1947. Since 2014 the city has used it for the burial of notable Milanese artists.

=== Central ossuary ===
The central ossuary stands on the axis between the Famedio and the crematorium. It was completed to Maciachini's design in 1873. Its upper part was a Catholic chapel until 1930, when it became an ossuary; the lower part, like a crypt, holds the oldest burial cells. The building has alternating bands of stone and brick and an octagonal dome with pinnacles at the corners. Its walls carry plaques for people buried in earlier cemeteries, among them Karl Thomas Mozart (1784–1858), the son of Wolfgang Amadeus Mozart, who worked as an official in Milan under Austrian rule.

=== Necropolis ===
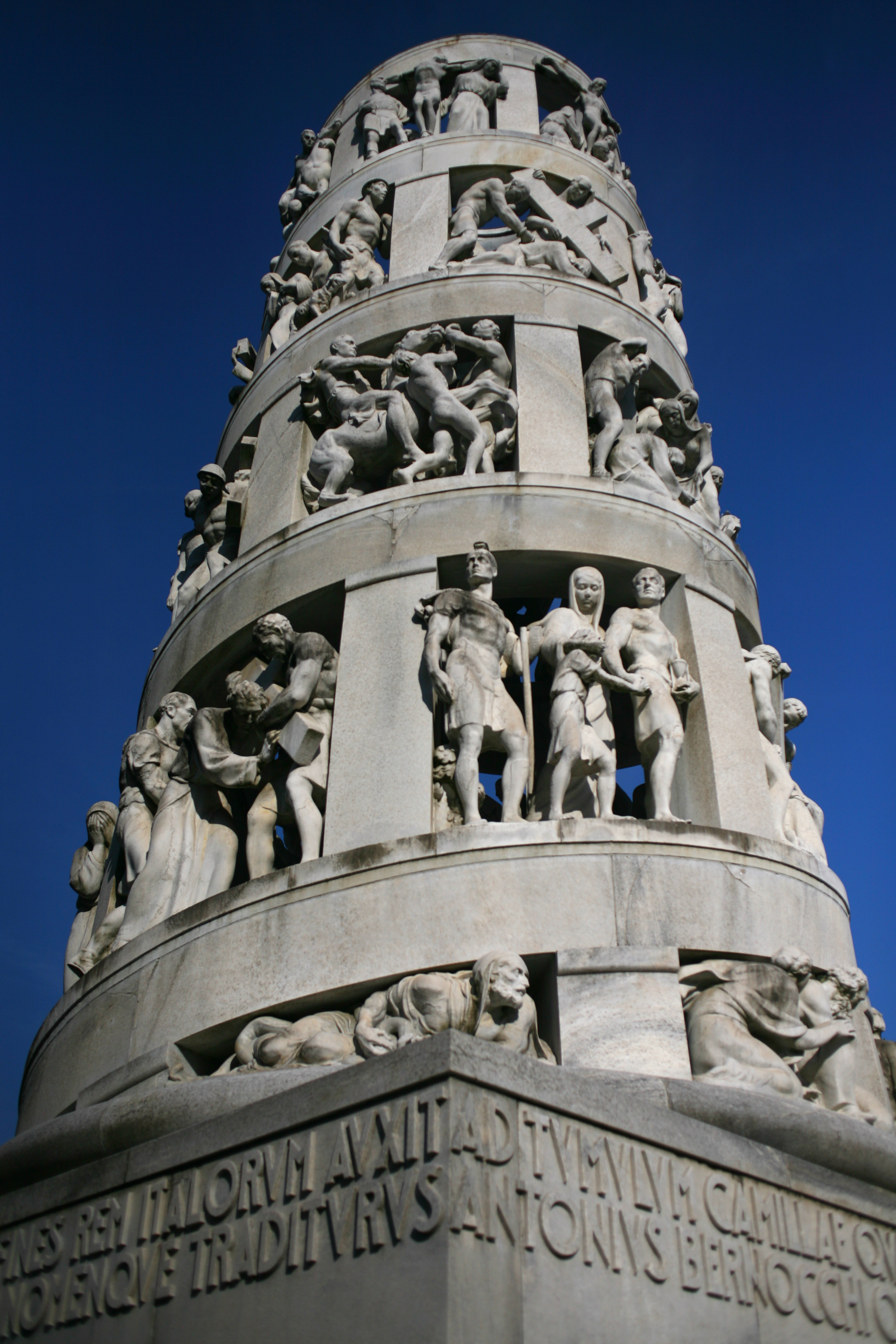
Tomb of the Bernocchi family by Alessandro Minali and Giannino Castiglioni

Unfinished Chierichetti chapel by Adolfo Wildt (1921)

The area beside and behind the ossuary, known as the Necropolis, was set aside mainly for family chapels. Wealthy Milanese families built their tombs there, among them the Turati, Borghi, Frua De Angeli and Bruni families, all textile manufacturers, the Sonzogno publishing family, and the Borletti, Bernocchi and Conti families. Unlike the rest of the cemetery, its paths are laid out as concentric octagons rather than a grid. At its north end is the Chierichetti chapel by Adolfo Wildt, and at its centre stands the spiral tower built by Alessandro Minali and Giannino Castiglioni for the family of Antonio Bernocchi.

=== Non-Catholic section ===
From the start Maciachini included two sections for people of other faiths: one on the west side for non-Catholics, such as Protestants, Greek Orthodox and Armenians, and one on the east side for the Jewish community. Both have their own entrances. At the centre of the non-Catholic section is the chapel of Alberto Keller, who funded the cemetery's crematorium; it was built by Maciachini with the sculptor Giosuè Argenti and the painter Luigi Cavenaghi. Among the oldest graves are those of families of Swiss or German origin who worked in silk and banking, such as the Mylius and Vonwiller families, in ceramics, such as the Richard family, and in watchmaking, such as the Eberhard family. The publisher Ulrico Hoepli has a monument by Adolfo Wildt. Over time the section has also received people who did not belong to any religion, such as the sculptor Medardo Rosso.

== Jewish section ==
Menorah in the Jewish section

The section, designed by Carlo Maciachini, opened in 1872 to replace the cemeteries of Porta Tenaglia, Porta Magenta, and Porta Vercellina. It lies east of the Catholic cemetery and has a separate entrance. The area is the result of a 1913 expansion to the southern and east. The central building was originally the entrance to the cemetery.

Tomb numbering is repeated because the cemetery is divided into six fields and an addition in the eastern side. There are also three common fields, including one for children, where burials date from 1873 to 1894, with small gravestones on the ground bearing the names and dates of death.

The monuments, built from 1866 onward, are located along the walkways. There are also family shrines, two of which were designed by Maciachini, columbaria, and ossuaries along the northern and western cemetery walls and burials in the central building. There are 1778 burials, some in memory of people killed by in Nazi concentration camps or in the Lake Maggiore massacres, including at Meina.

There are many monuments of artistic value built by important architects and sculptors, described in the guide book by Giovanna Ginex and Ornella Selvafolta.

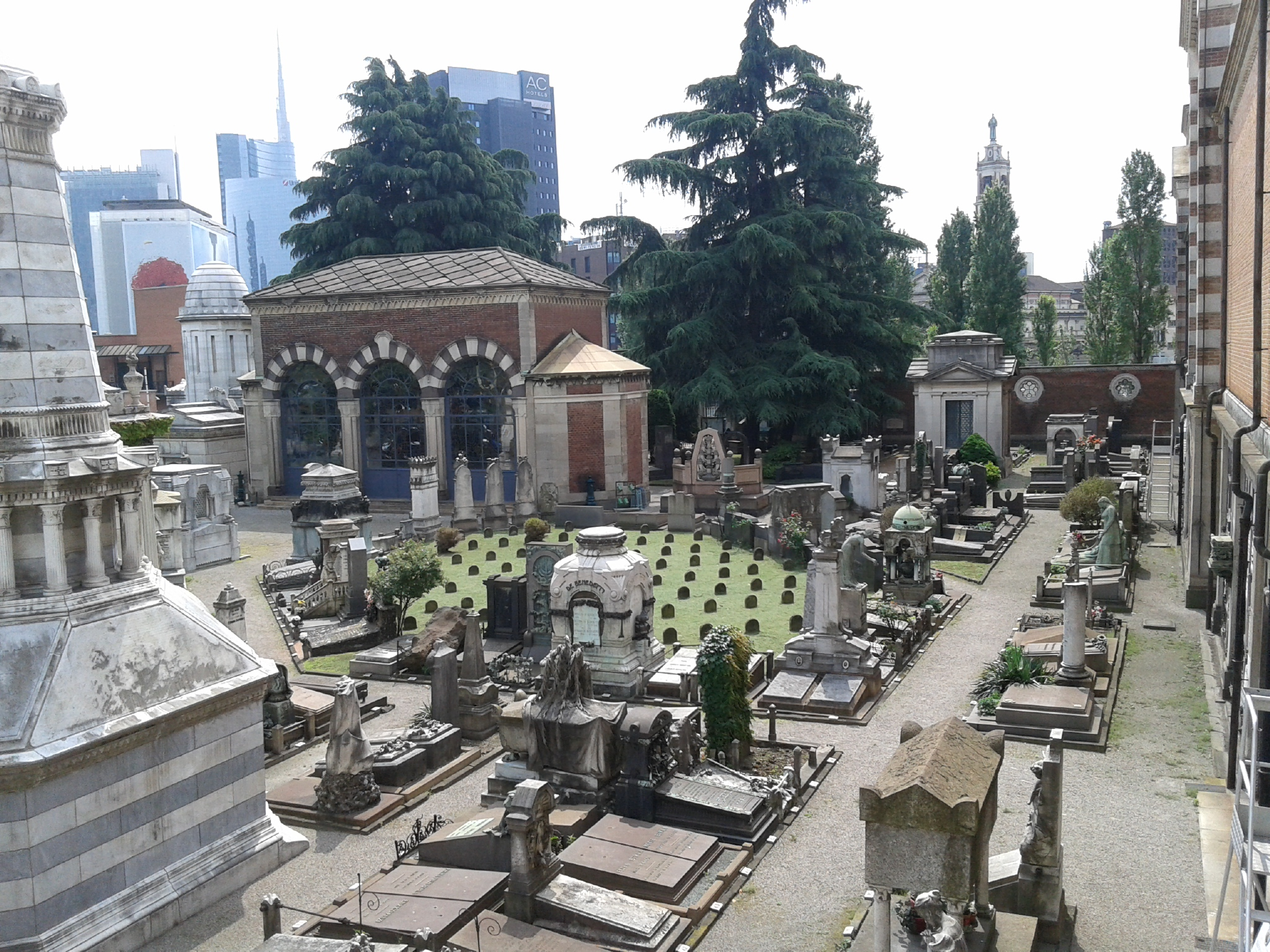
Jewish section, photo from above

The following architects have worked in the Jewish section: Carlo Maciachini (Davide Leonino and Pisa shrines), Giovanni Battista Bossi (Anselmo de Benedetti tomb), Ercole Balossi Merlo (Leon David Levi shrine), Luigi Conconi (Segre shrine), Giovanni Ceruti (Vitali shrine), Carlo Meroni (Taranto tomb), Cesare Mazzocchi (Giulio Foligno shrine), Manfredo d'Urbino (Jarach shrine, Mayer tomb, Besso tomb, Monument to the Jewish Martyrs of Nazism), Gigiotti Zanini (Zanini tomb), Adolfo Valabrega (Moisé Foligno shrine), Luigi Perrone (Goldfinger shrine). Sculptors whose work is found here include: Mario Quadrelli (Pisa shrine), Giuseppe Daniele Benzoni (Ottolenghi Finzi tomb), Luigi Vimercati (Estella Jung tomb), Agostino Caravati (Alessandro Forti tomb), Rizzardo Galli (Vittorio Finzi tomb), Enrico Cassi (De Daninos tomb), Attilio Prendoni (Errera and Conforti tomb), Eduardo Ximenes (Treves shrine), Giulio Branca (Giovanni Norsa tomb, Michelangelo Carpi tomb), fratelli Bonfanti (Davide and Beniamino Foà tomb), Enrico Astorri (Carolina Padova and Fanny Levi Cammeo tomb), Egidio Boninsegna (Giuseppe Levi tomb), Dario Viterbo (Levi Minzi columbarium), Giannino Castiglioni (Ettore Levis and Goldfinger tombs), Adolfo Wildt (Cesare Sarfatti tomb), Eugenio Pellini (Bettino Levi tomb), Arrigo Minerbi (Renato del Mar tomb), Roberto Terracini (Nino Colombo tomb).

The central building was enhanced in May 2015 with artistic windows that represent the Twelve Tribes of Israel by the artist Diego Pennacchio Ardemagni.

== Crematorium ==
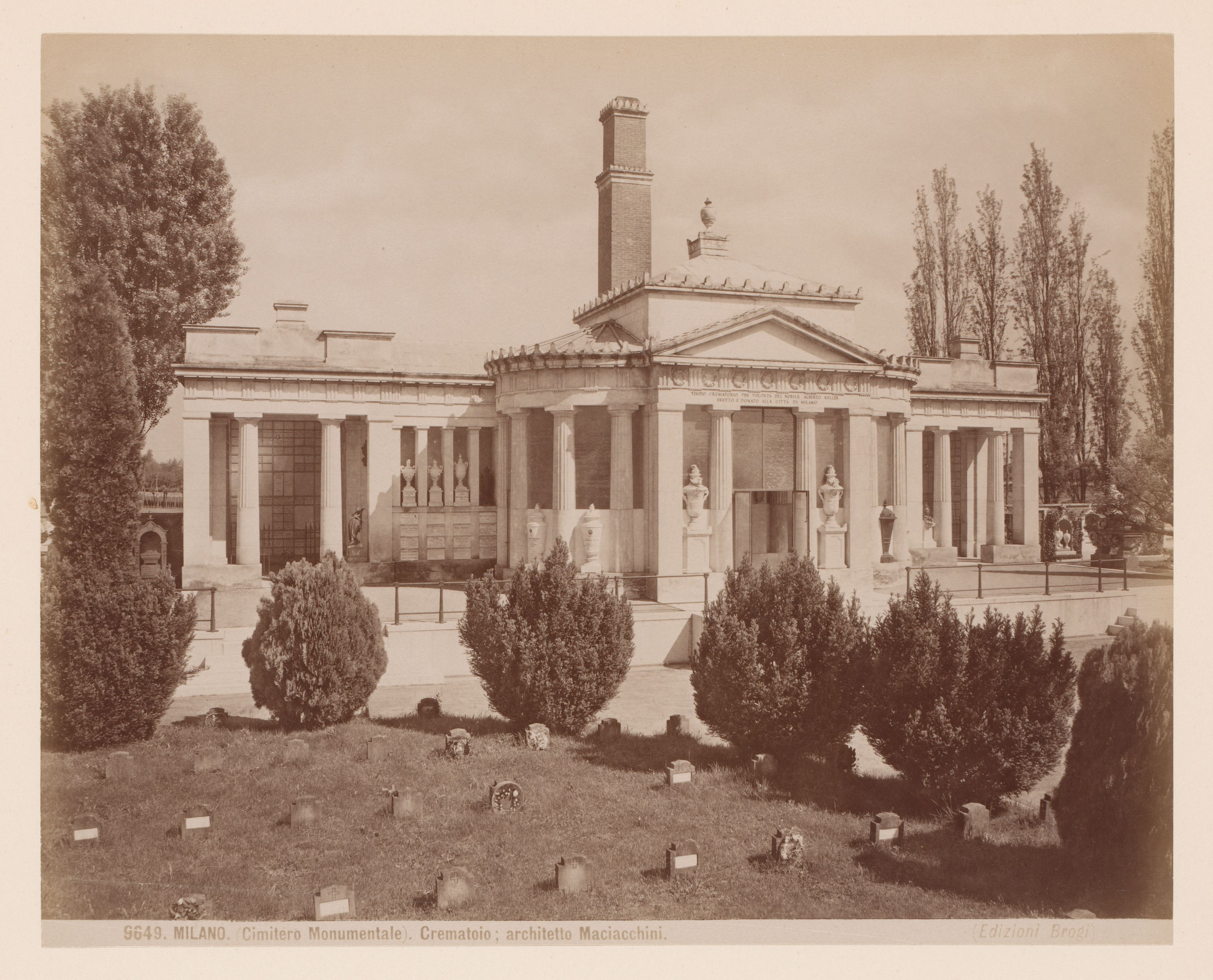
The Crematorium

The cemetery contains the Crematorium Temple, which was the first crematorium to open in the Western world. The crematorium opened in 1876 and was operational until 1992. The building is also a columbarium. As with other early crematoria in Italy, it was built in Greek Revival architecture.

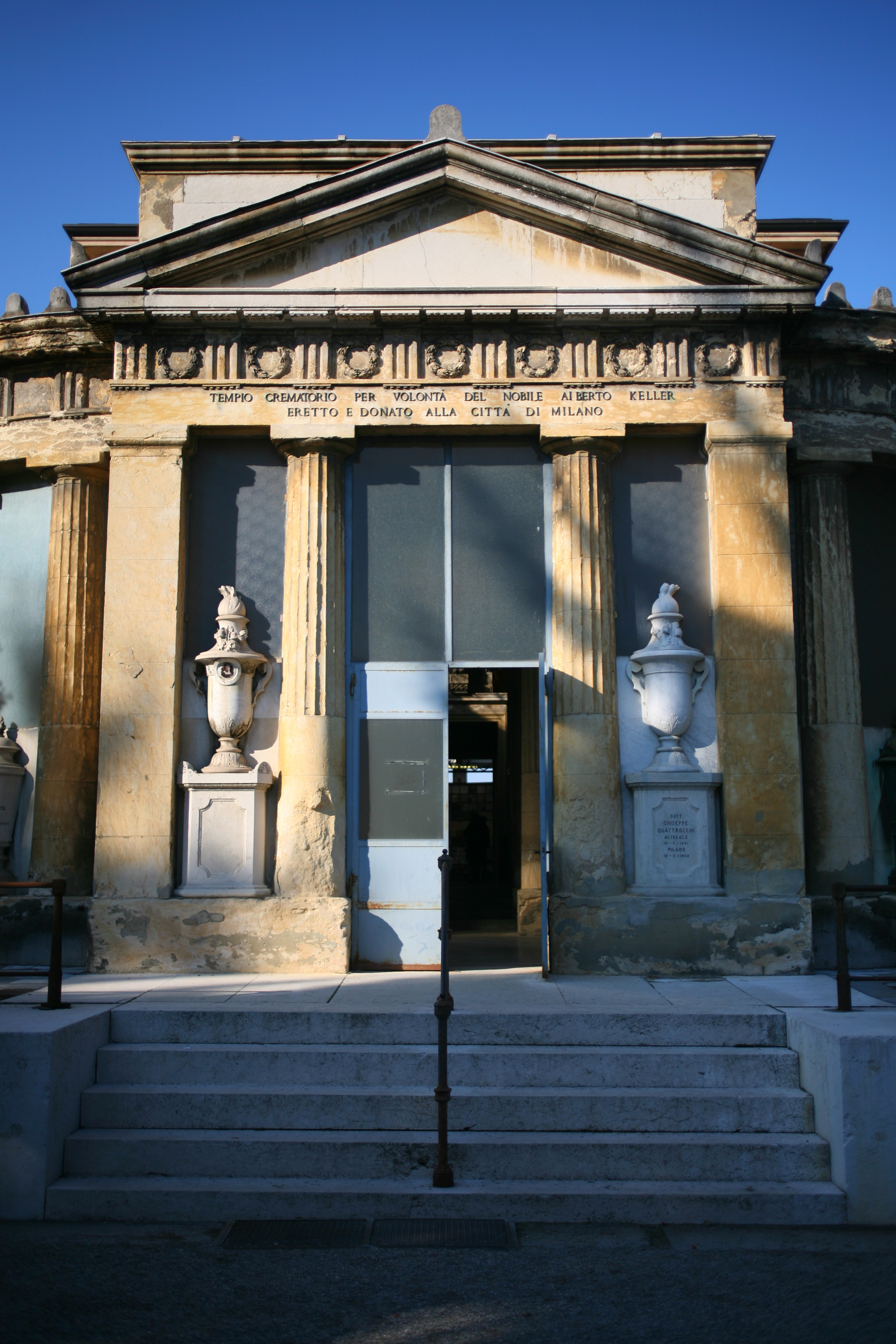
Entrance to the crematorium, with the dedication to Alberto Keller

The first cremation, of Alberto Keller, 22 January 1876. Woodcut from L'Illustrazione Italiana

The crematorium stands at the far end of the cemetery's main avenue. It was paid for by Alberto Keller (1800–1874), a silk merchant who left money so that cremation could be introduced in Milan. It was given to the city and opened in 1876, two years after Keller's death, with the cremation of his own body. The official cemetery website describes Milan as the first city in Italy, and one of the first in Europe, to adopt cremation.

The original building of 1875 was designed by Maciachini with the engineer Celeste Clericetti, in the Greek Doric style. It has a square central hall with a vestibule of two semicircular colonnades. The first cremations took place on a stone altar heated by gas flames, following a method developed by Polli and Clericetti. In 1896, after improvements to the process by Paolo Gorini, the architect Augusto Guidini enlarged the building, adding a room at the back with four ovens. A bronze portrait of Gorini by Giuseppe Grandi hangs in the oven room.

== Famous graves ==
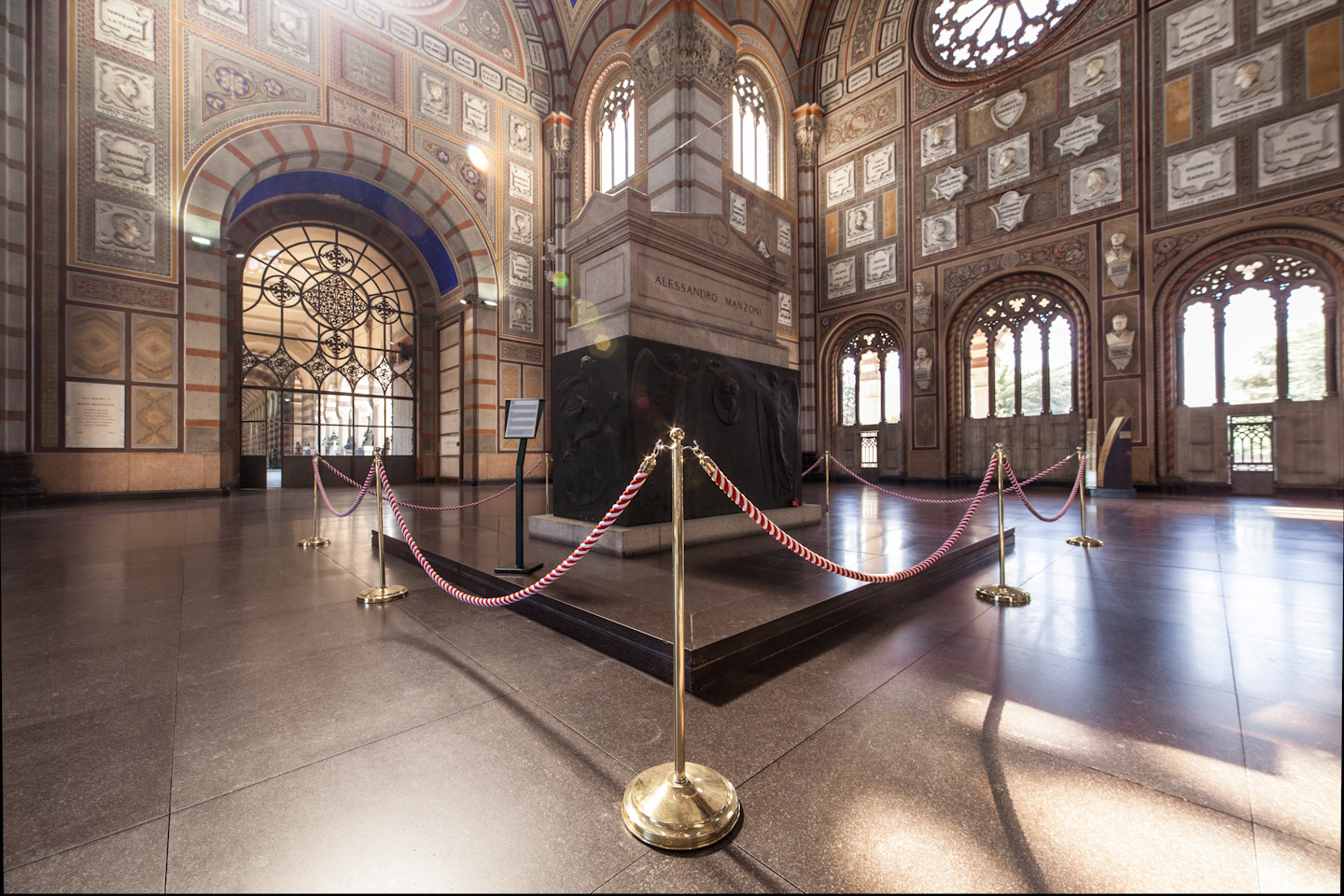
Alessandro Manzoni's tomb

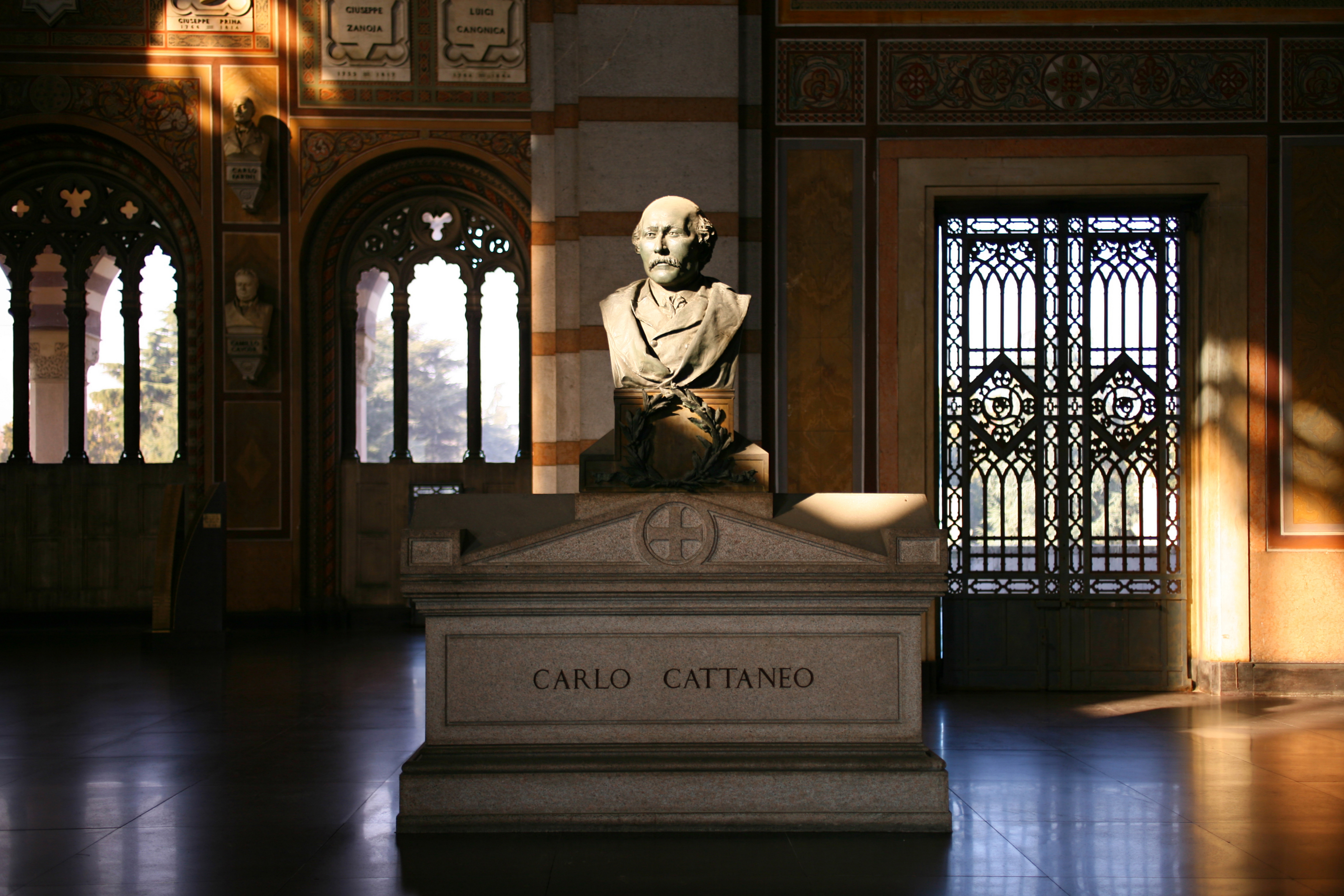
Carlo Cattaneo's tomb

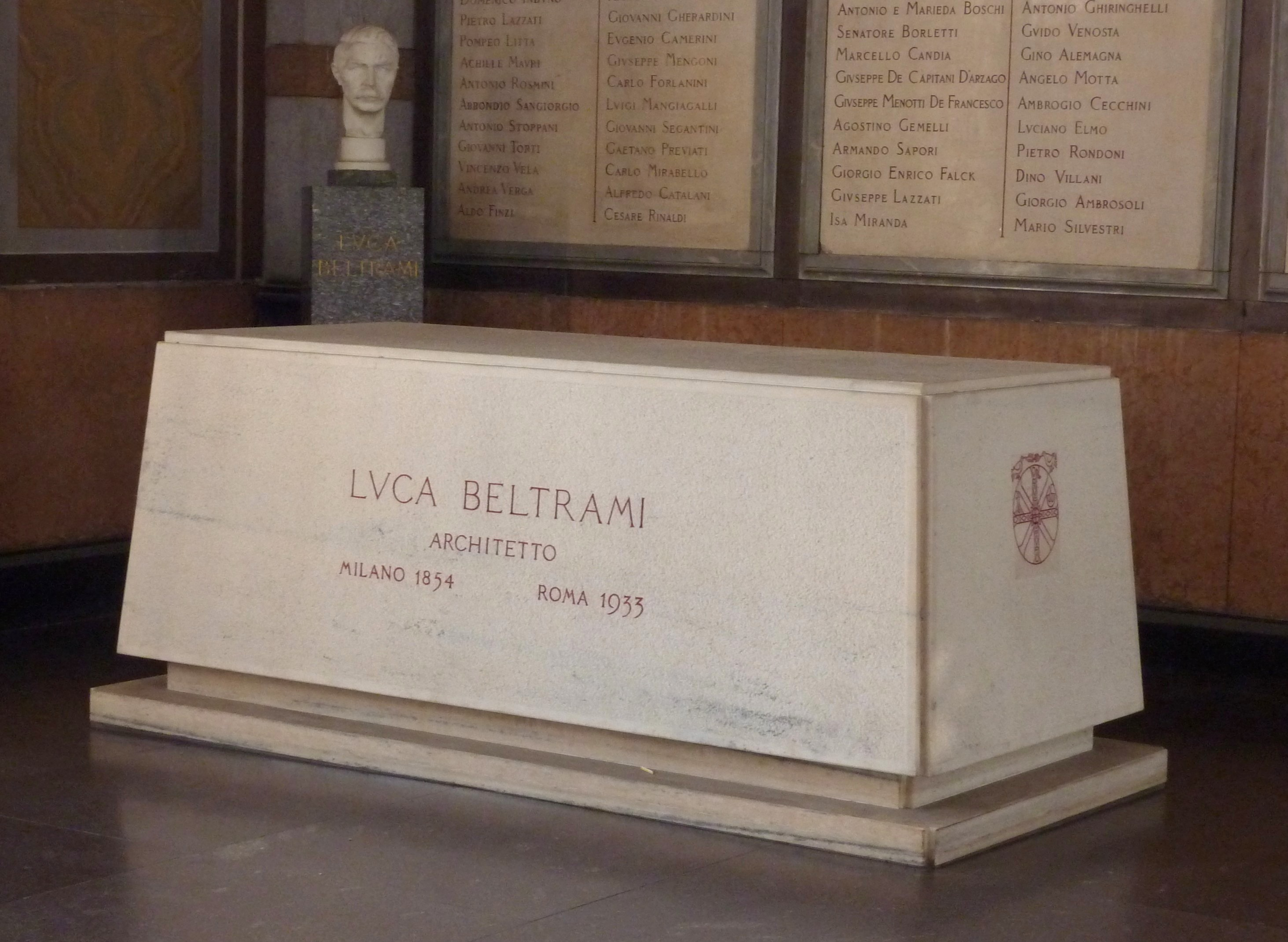
Luca Beltrami's tomb

Directional signs placed throughout the cemetery guide visitors to many of its most significant tombs and monuments. Notable people interred there include:

- Alberto Ascari (1918–1955), Formula One champion driver
- Alberto Lattuada (1914–2005), director
- Alessandro Manzoni (1785–1873), poet, novelist, considered the founder of modern Italian language; tomb located at the very center of the Famedio
- Alda Merini (1931–2009), poet
- Amilcare Ponchielli (1834–1886), composer
- Anna Kuliscioff (1857–1925), political activist
- Antonio Ascari (1888–1925), Grand Prix champion driver
- Antonio Bernocchi (1859–1939), industrialist
- Arrigo Boito (1842–1918), composer, librettist
- Arturo Toscanini (1867–1957), conductor and cellist
- Bruno Munari (1907–1998), artist
- Camilla Cederna (1911–1997), editor, writer
- Camillo Boito (1836–1914), architect
- Candido Cannavò (1930–2009), journalist
- Carla Fracci (1936–2021), ballet dancer; first woman to be entombed in the Famedio
- Carlo Cattaneo (1801–1869), philosopher, patriot
- Cesare Maldini (1932–2016), football player
- Dario Fo (1926–2016), 1997 Nobel Prize in Literature
- Domenico Induno (1815–1878), painter
- Emilio Longoni (1859–1932), painter
- Enzo Jannacci (1935–2013), singer-songwriter
- Ernesto Bazzaro (1859–1937), sculptor
- Fernanda Wittgens (1903–1957), art historian and art critic
- Filippo Filippi (1830–1887), journalist, music critic
- Filippo Tommaso Marinetti (1876–1944), poet and main founder of the futurist movement
- Filippo Turati (1857–1932), politician
- Franca Rame (1929–2013), political activist, actress
- Francesco Hayez (1791–1882), painter
- Francesco Maria Piave (1810–1876), librettist, poet
- Franco Corelli (1921–2003), opera tenor
- Franco Moschino (1950–1994), fashion designer
- Gae Aulenti (1927–2012), architect
- Gaspare Campari (1828–1882), drink maker
- Gianroberto Casaleggio (1954–2016), entrepreneur, political activist
- Giangiacomo Feltrinelli (1926–1972), publisher, businessman
- Gino Bramieri (1928–1996), comedian and actor
- Gio Ponti (1891–1979), architect, industrial designer, artist
- Giò Pomodoro (1930–2002), artist
- Giovanni Pesce (1918–2007), communist partisan
- Giovanni Treccani (1877–1961), publisher
- Giulio Mongeri (1873–1951), architect
- Giulietta Pezzi (1810–1878), writer
- Giorgio Gaber (1939–2003), singer-songwriter, comedian
- Giorgio Gaslini (1929–2014), jazz pianist, composer, conductor
- Giuseppe Meazza (1910–1979), football player and manager
- Giuseppe Palanti (1881–1946), painter
- Guido Crepax (1933-2003), comics artist
- Herbert Kilpin (1870–1916), founder of A.C. Milan football club
- Hermann Einstein (1847–1902), father of Albert Einstein
- Leo Valiani (1909–1999), writer, politician
- Lelio Basso (1903–1978), politician
- Lina Merlin (1887–1979), politician
- Luca Beltrami (1854–1933), architect
- Luigi Giussani (1922–2005), priest, founder of "Communion and Liberation"
- Magda Olivero (1910–2014), opera soprano
- Mario Palanti (1885–1978), architect
- Mario Tiberini (1826–1880) and his wife Angiolina Ortolani-Tiberini (1834–1913), opera singers.
- Medardo Rosso (1858–1928), sculptor
- Piero Sacerdoti (1905–1966), insurer
- Philippe Daverio (1949–2020), art historian
- Rosa Chiarina Scolari (1882–1949) Mother Superior who helped the Italian resistance movement
- Salvatore Quasimodo (1901–1968), 1959 Nobel prize in Literature
- Temistocle Solera (1815–1878), poet, opera composer, librettist
- Ulrico Hoepli (1847-1935), publisher, founder of Hoepli Editore
- Valentina Cortese (1923–2019), actress
- Vladimir Horowitz (1903–1989), pianist
- Walter Chiari (1924–1991), actor

Mayors of Milan

- Aldo Aniasi (1921–2005), Mayor (1967–76)
- Angelo Filippetti (1866–1936), Mayor (1920–22)
- Carlo Tognoli (1938–2021), Mayor (1976–86)
- Emanuele Greppi (1853–1931), Mayor (1911–14)
- Emilio Caldara (1868–1942), Mayor (1914–20)
- Gino Cassinis (1885–1964), Mayor (1961–64)
- Giulio Belinzaghi (1818–1892), Mayor (1867–84; 1889–92)
- Marco Formentini (1930–2021), Mayor (1993–97)
- Virgilio Ferrari (1888–1975), Mayor (1951–61)

== Gallery ==
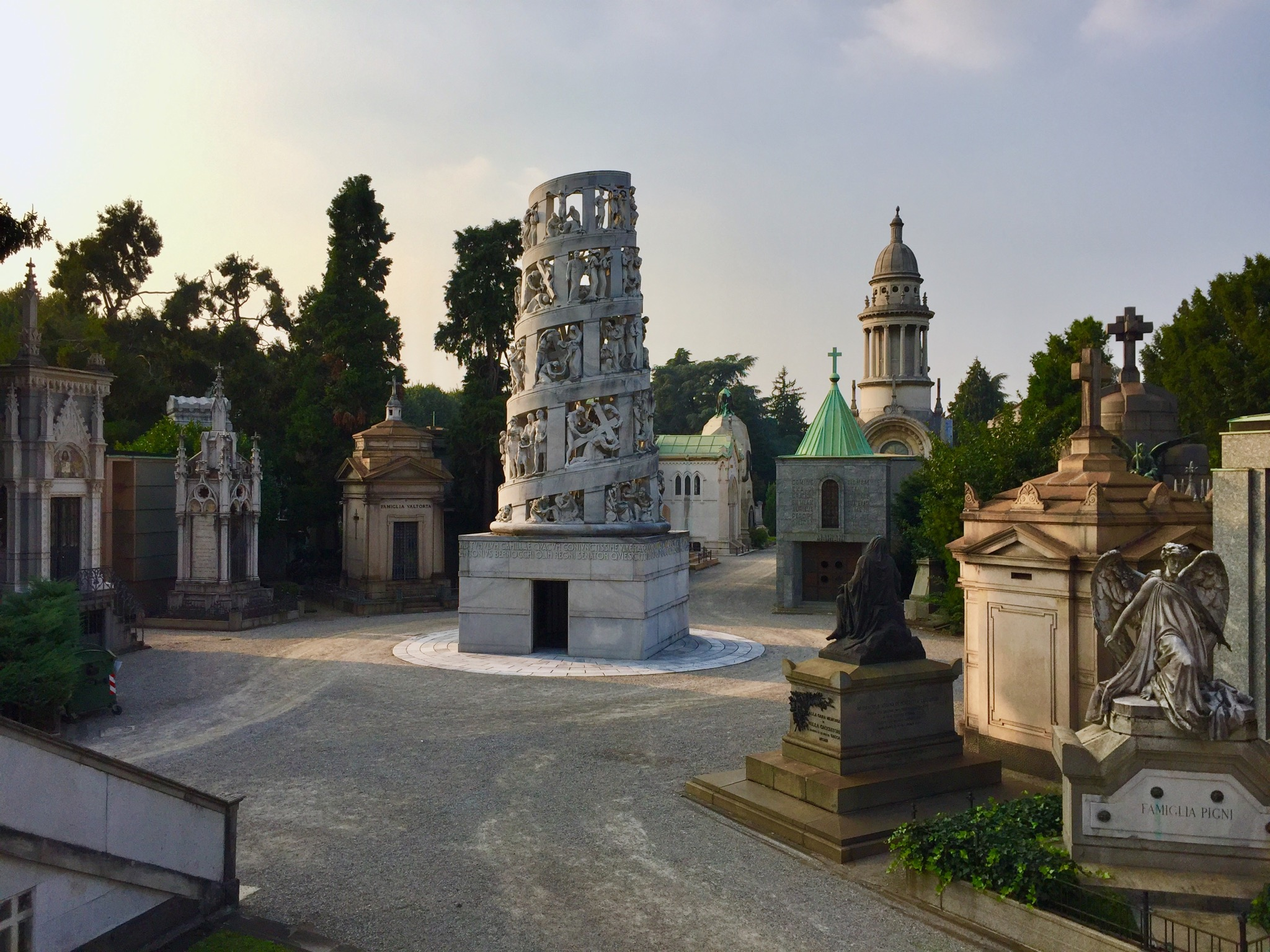
Mausoleum of Antonio Bernocchi by Giannino Castiglioni (1930s)

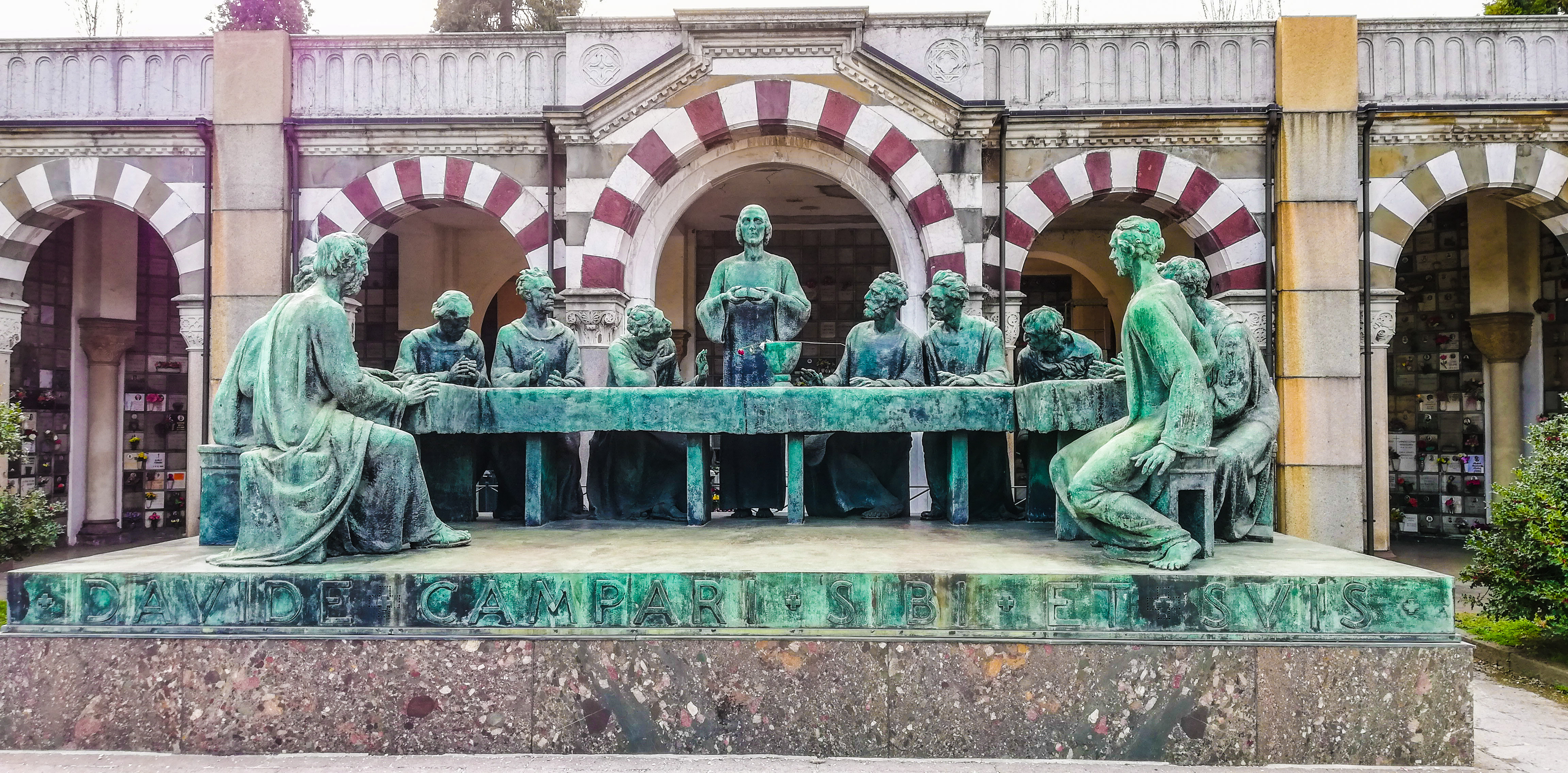
The Last Supper, Campari family tomb

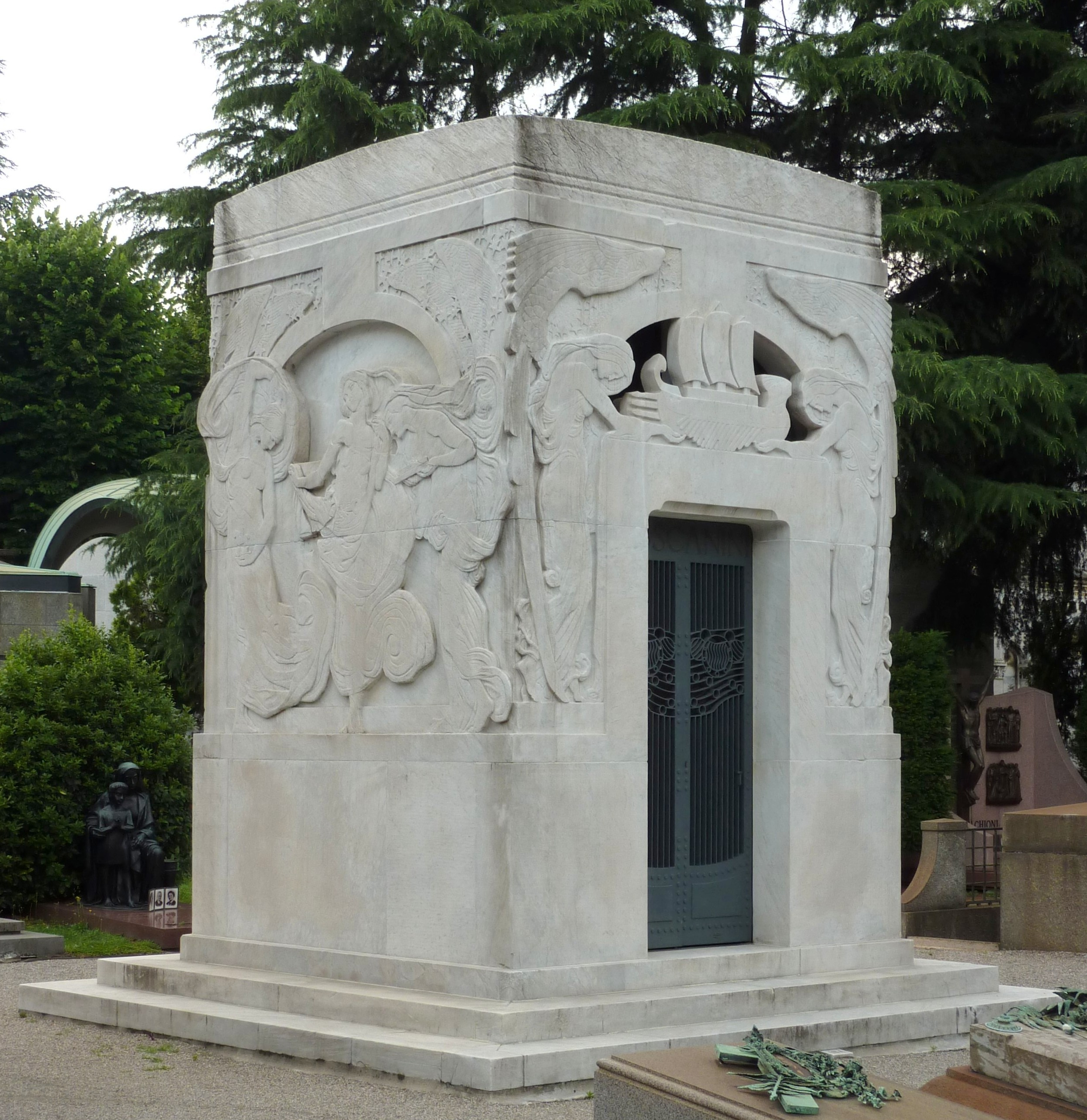
Arturo Toscanini's tomb

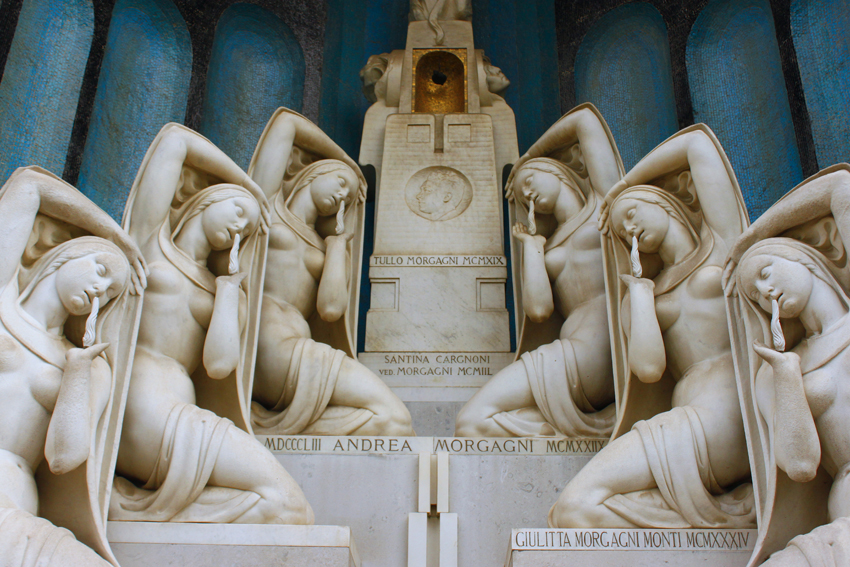
Morgagni family monument

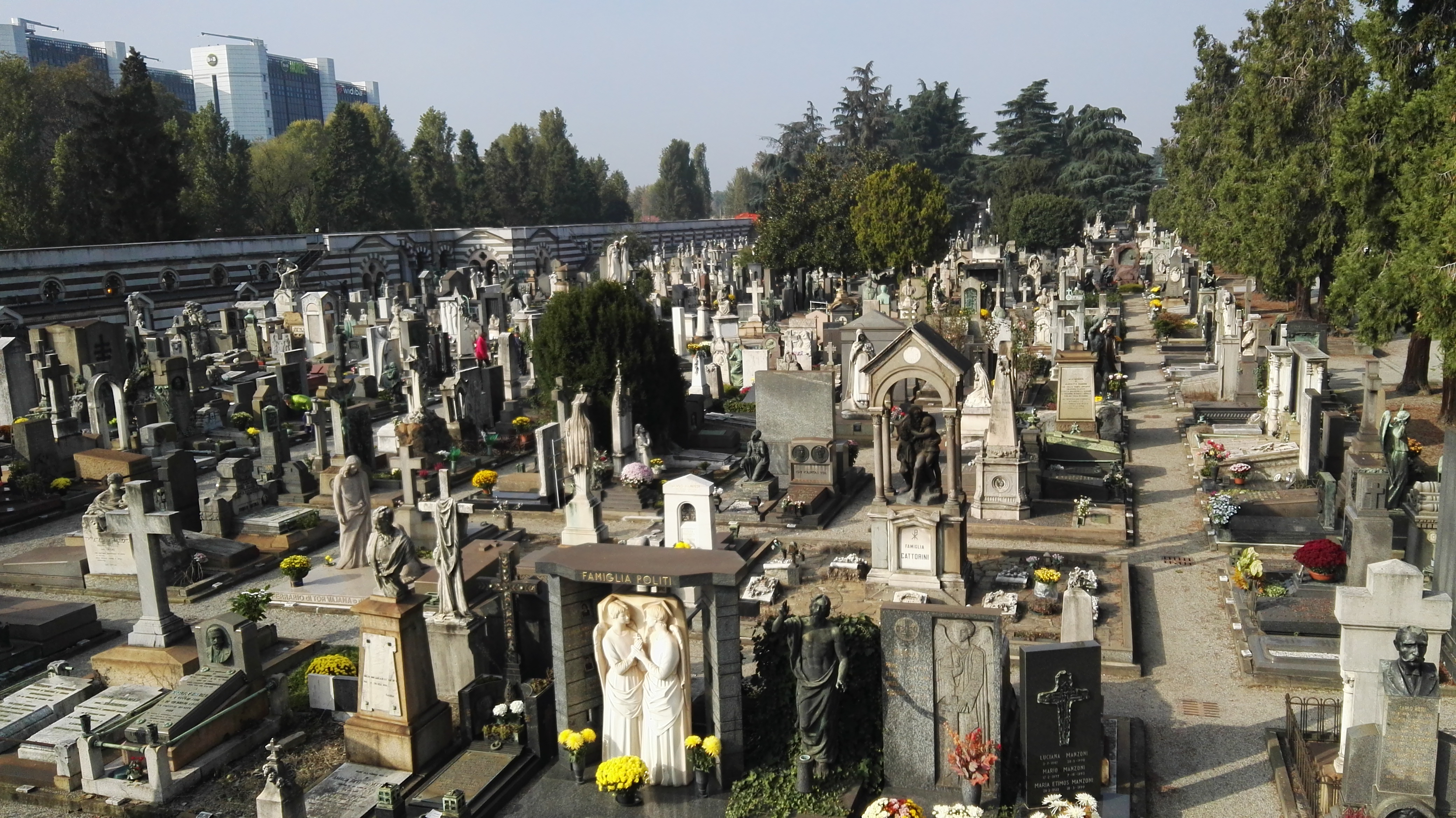
Cemetery section from above

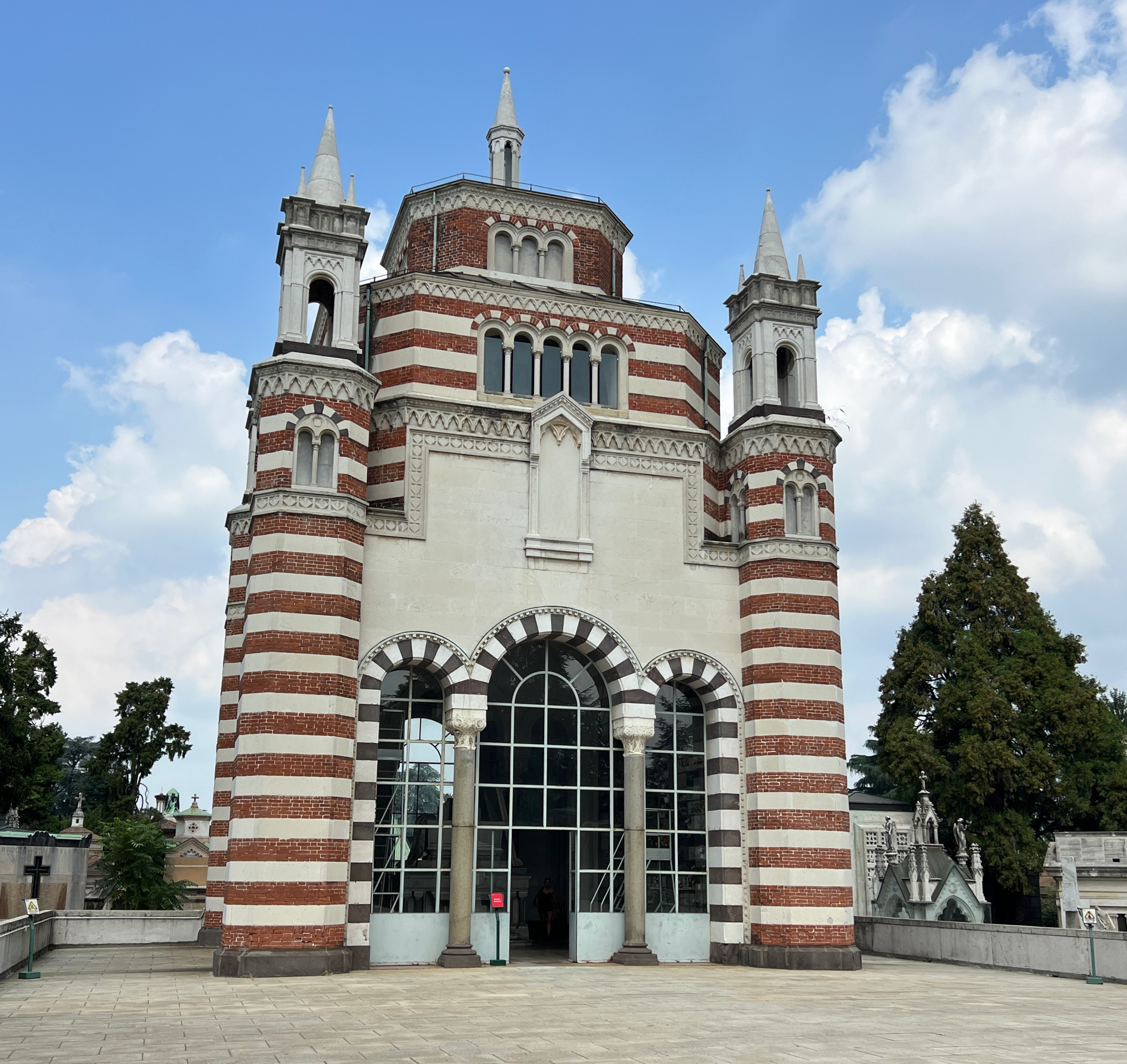
Ossuary

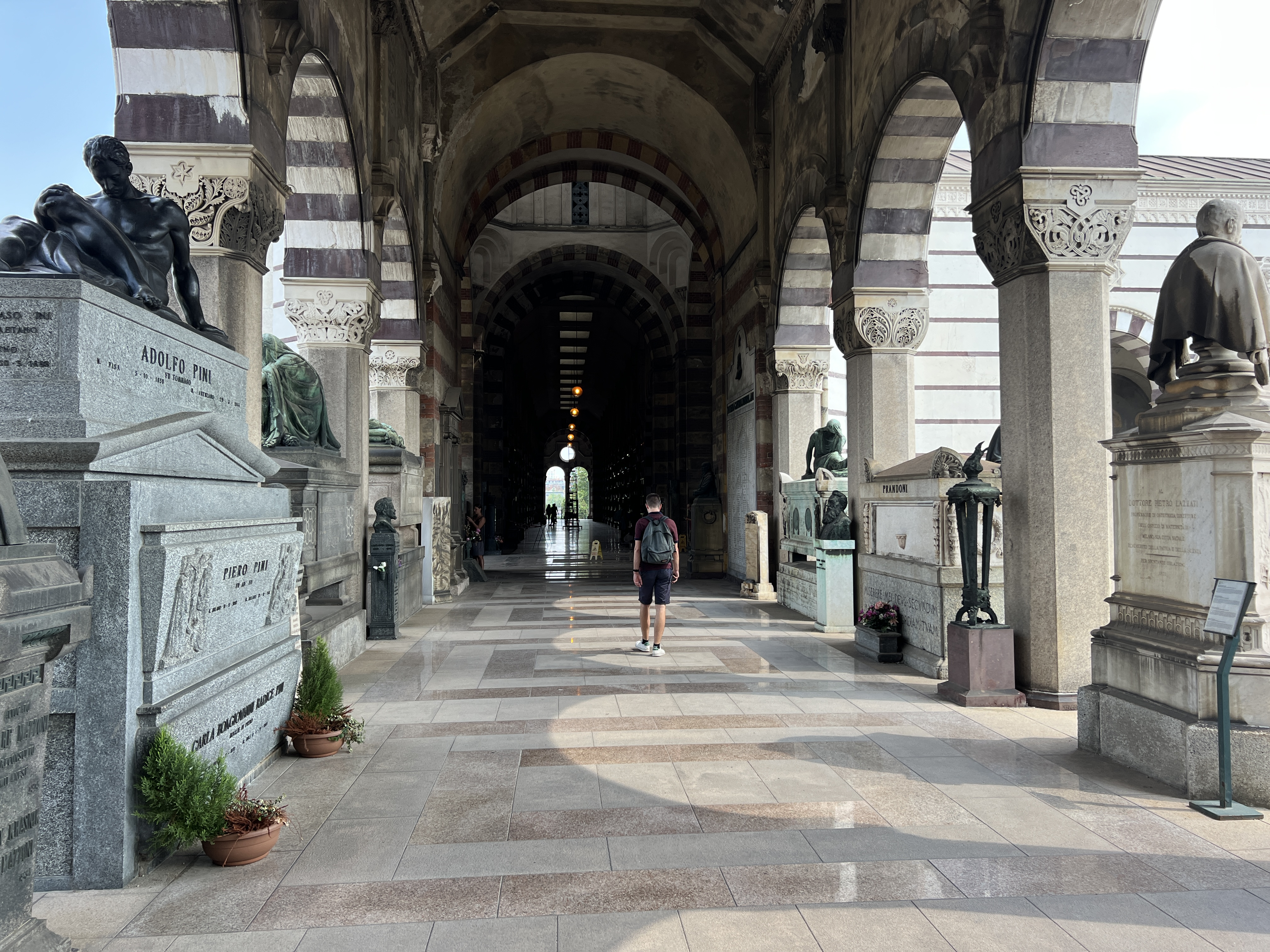
Arcades

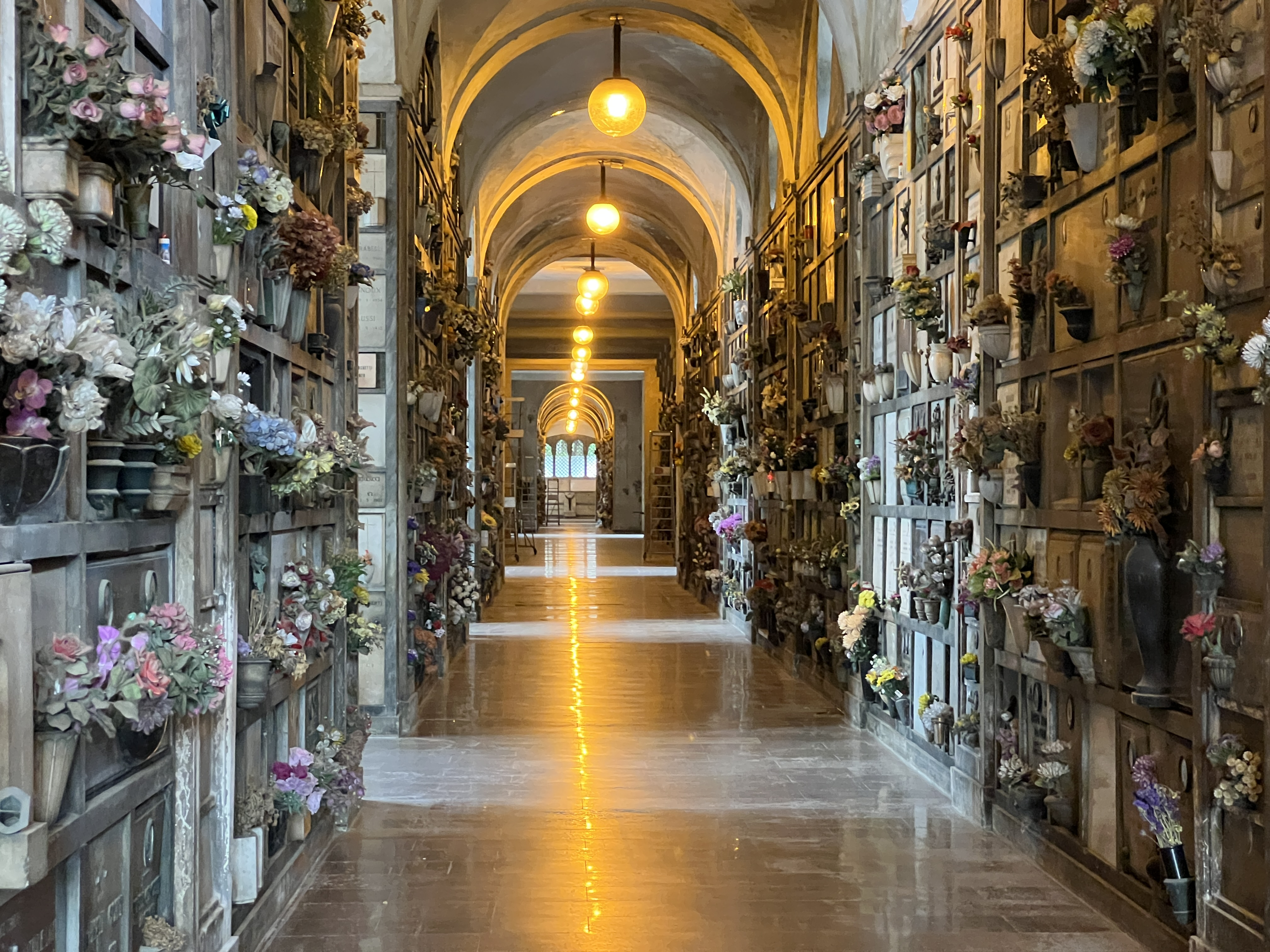
Galleries

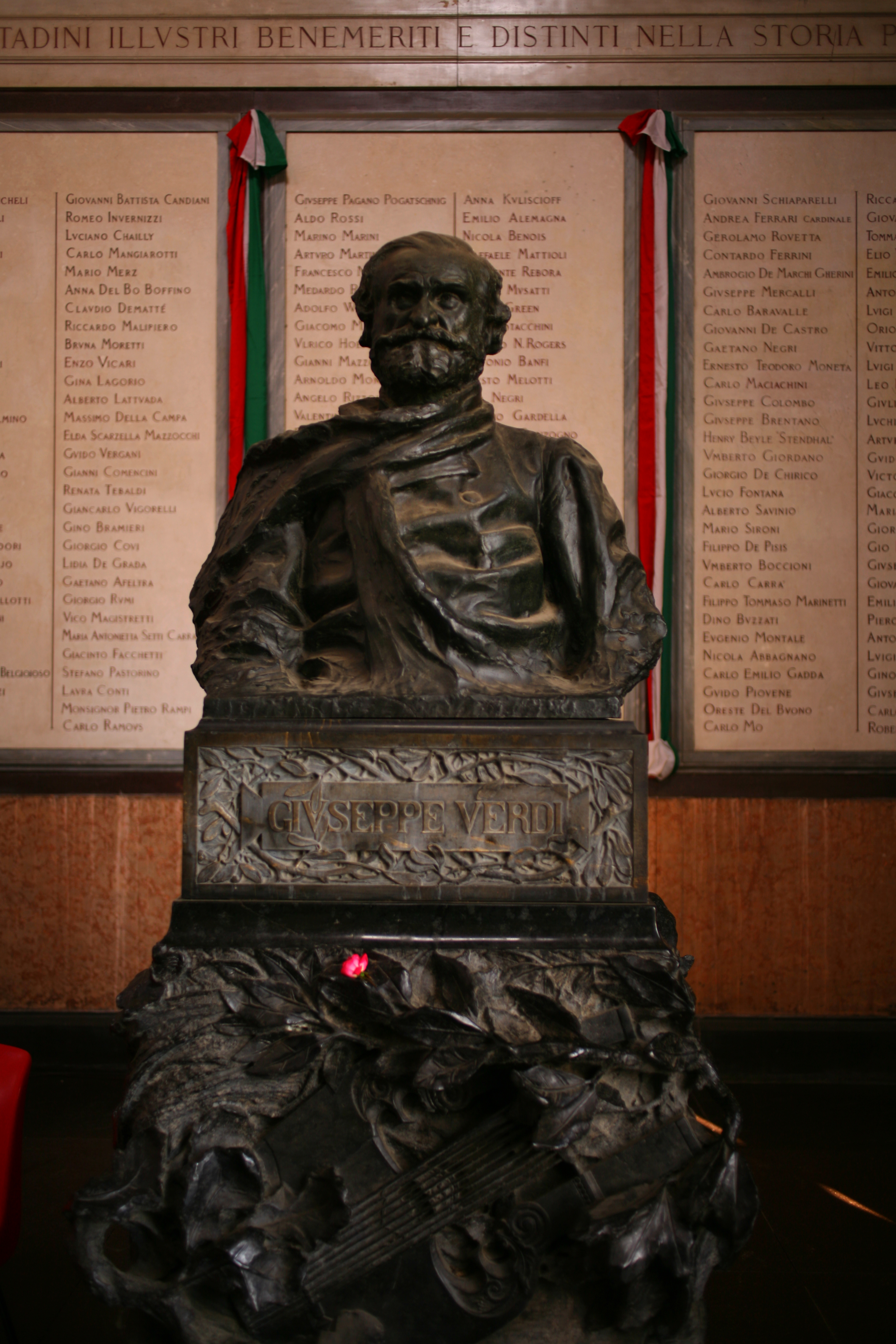
Bust of Giuseppe Verdi by Emilio Quadrelli (1902) in the Famedio

Volonté Vezzoli monument by Emilio Quadrelli (1889)

Vogel family monument by Egidio Mazzucchelli (1901–1902)

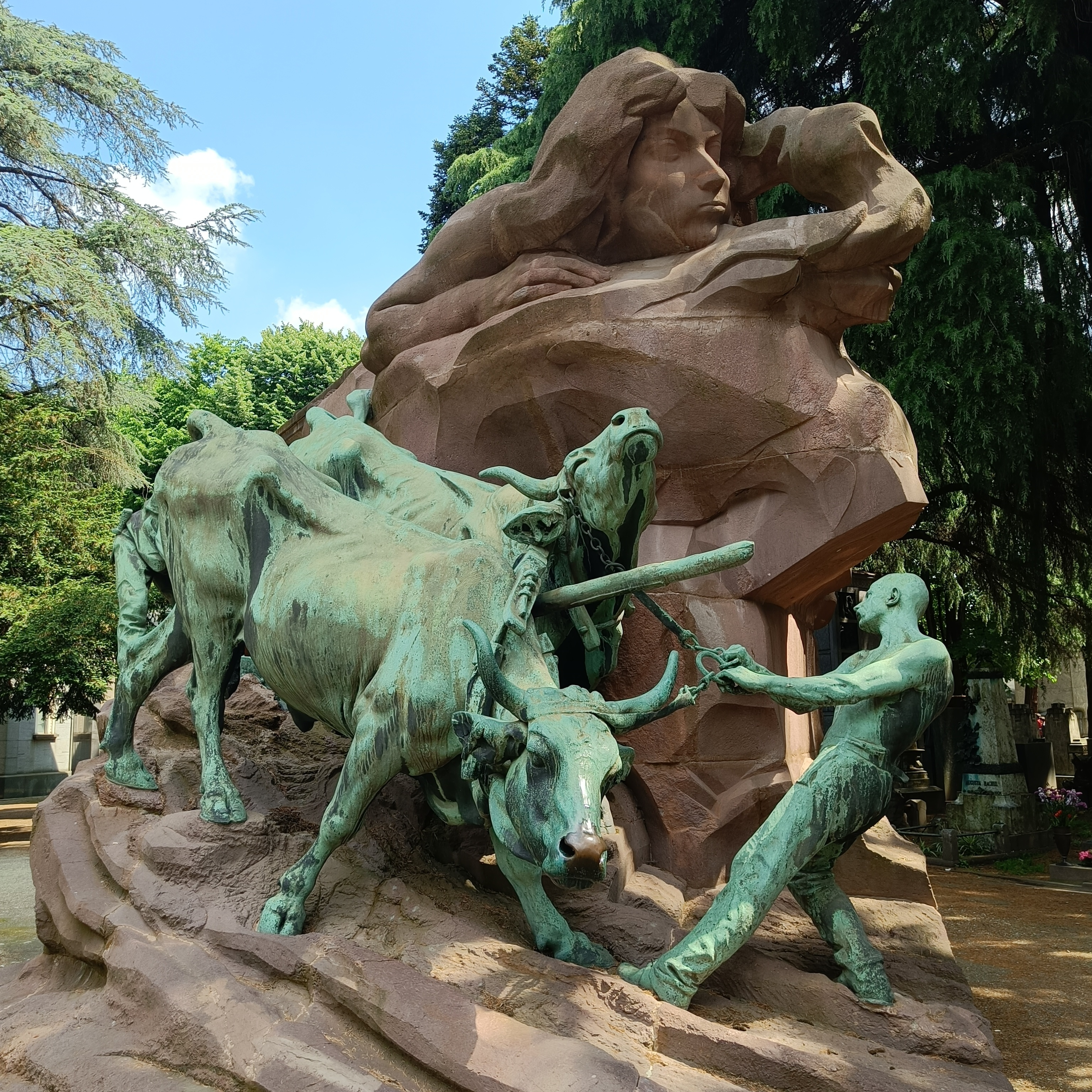
Ploughing, Besenzanica family monument by Enrico Butti (1907–1912)

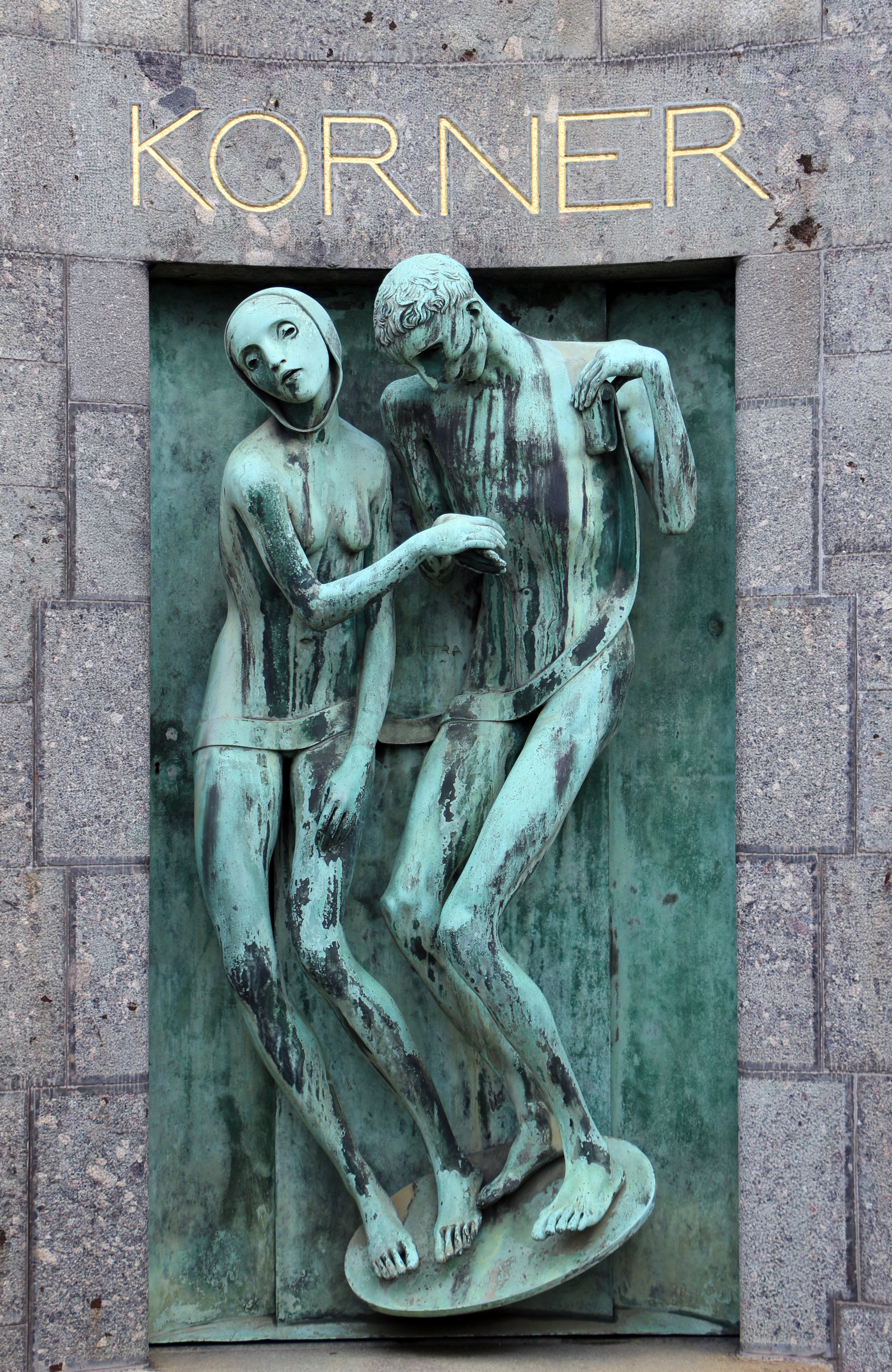
Korner family tomb by Giulio Ulisse Arata, with a sculpture by Adolfo Wildt (1929)

Monument to Giuseppe Poggi by Costantino Pandiani (1895)

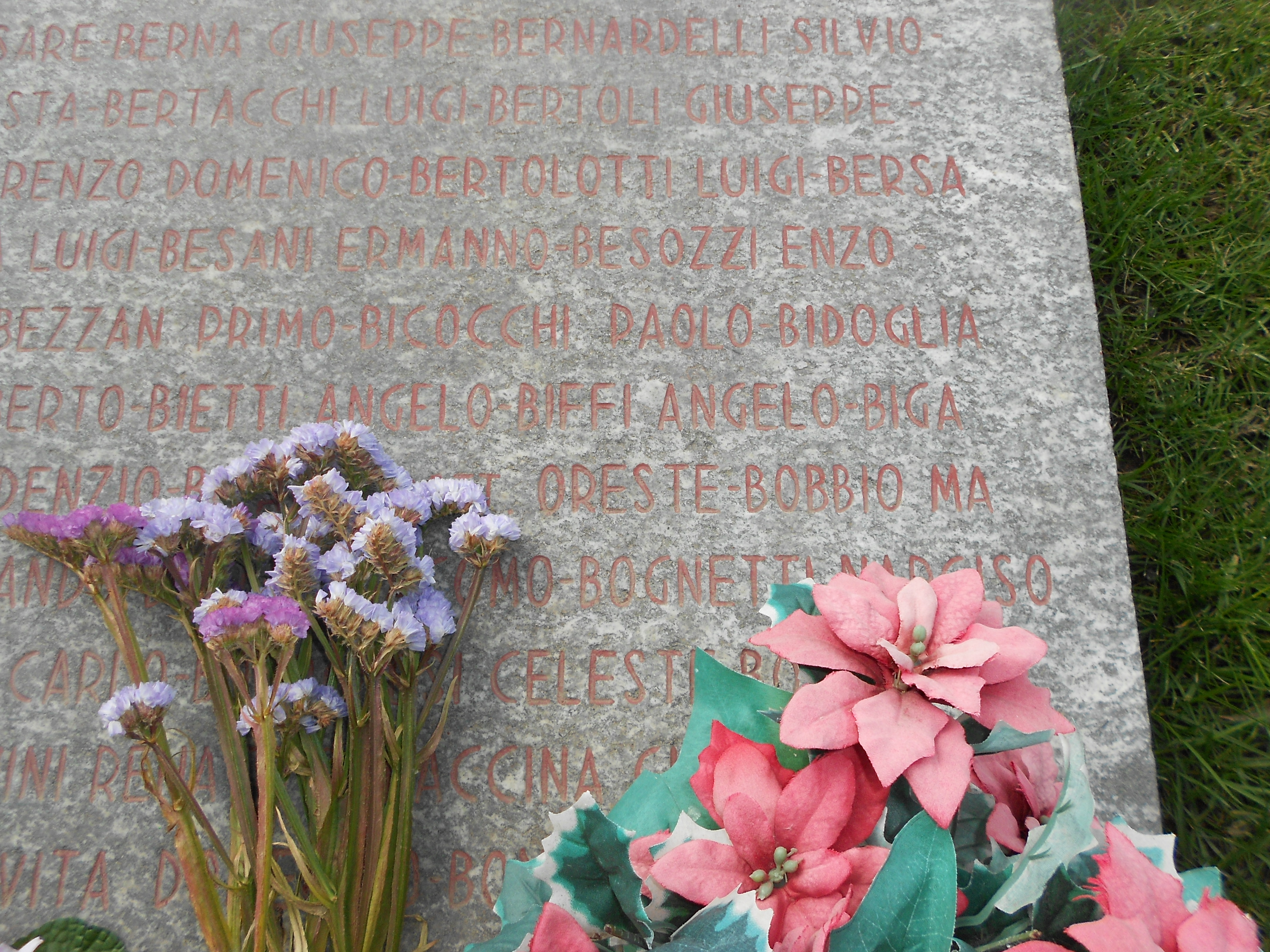
Plaque to people from Milan who died in Nazi camps

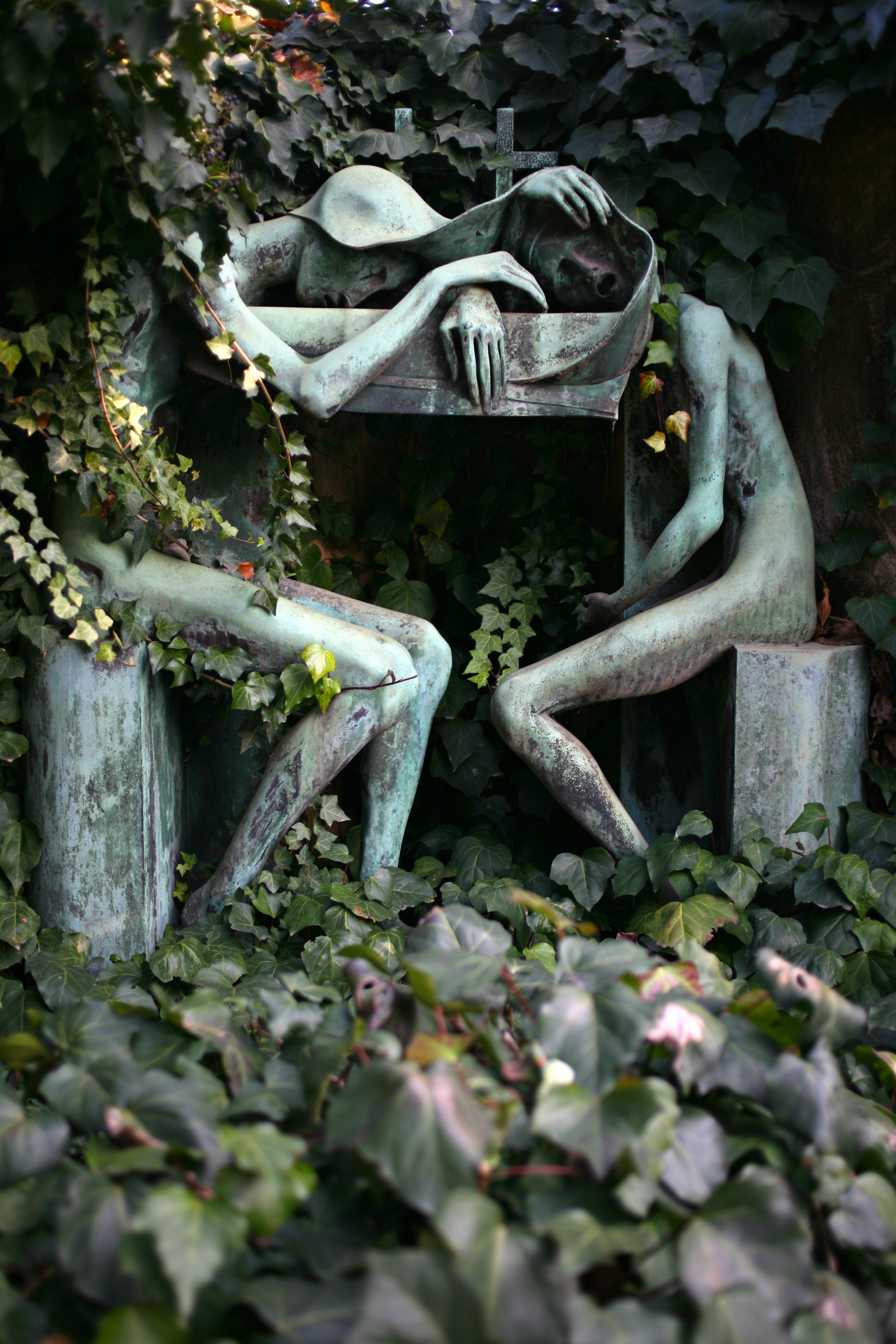
La casa del sonno, Bistoletti monument, by Adolfo Wildt (1927)

Monument to Vincenzo Brusco Onnis, by Medardo Rosso (1888)

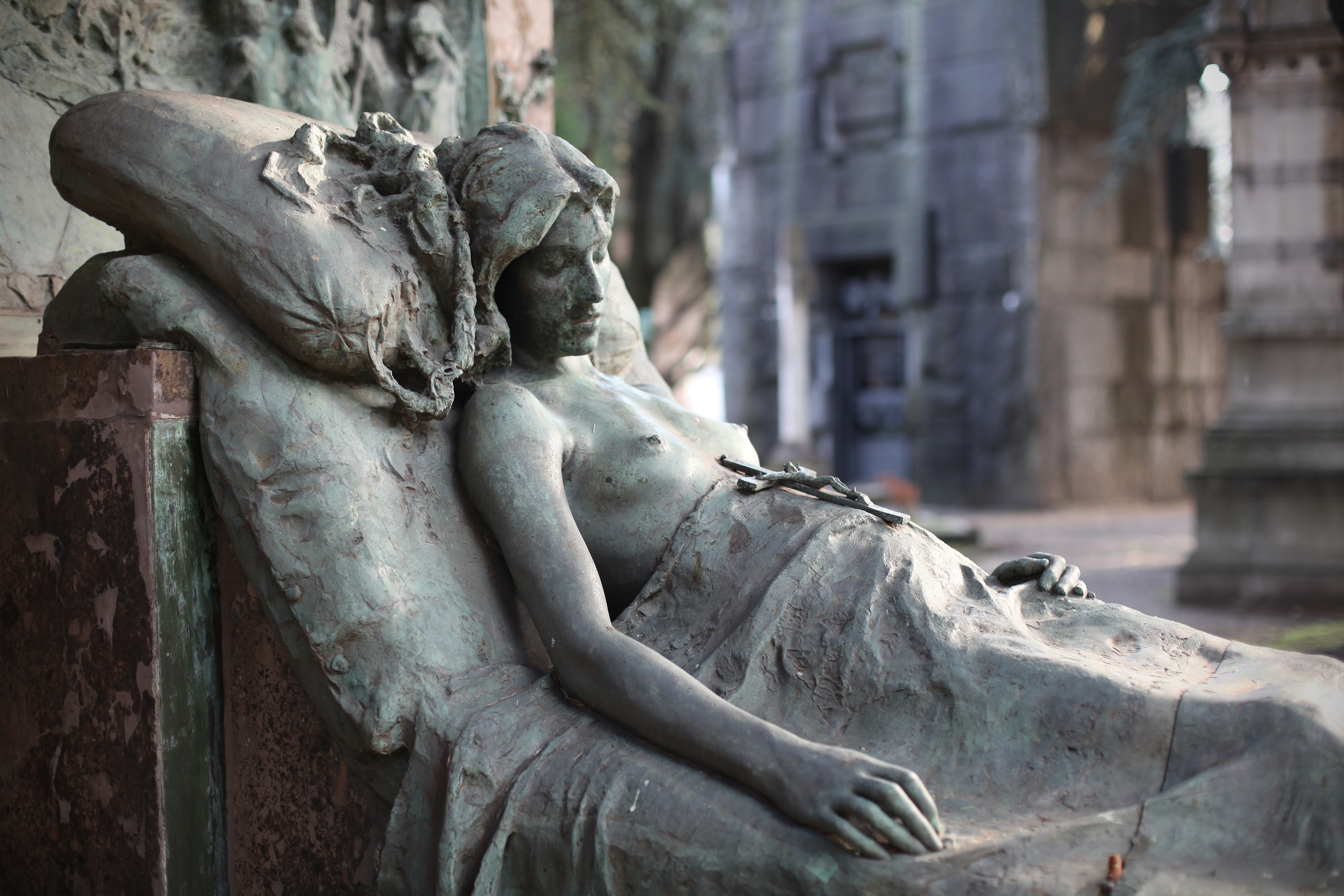
La morente, monument to Isabella Airoldi Casati, by Enrico Butti (1890–1891)

Bocconi family chapel by Orazio Grossoni (1913)

Falck family tomb, by Mino Fiocchi and Giannino Castiglioni (1939–1942)

Monument to Edoardo Berardi, by Lucio Fontana (1930)

Tomb of Alessandro Nava, by Giacomo Manzù (1928)

Civico Mausoleo Palanti (1924–1928), designed by Mario Palanti

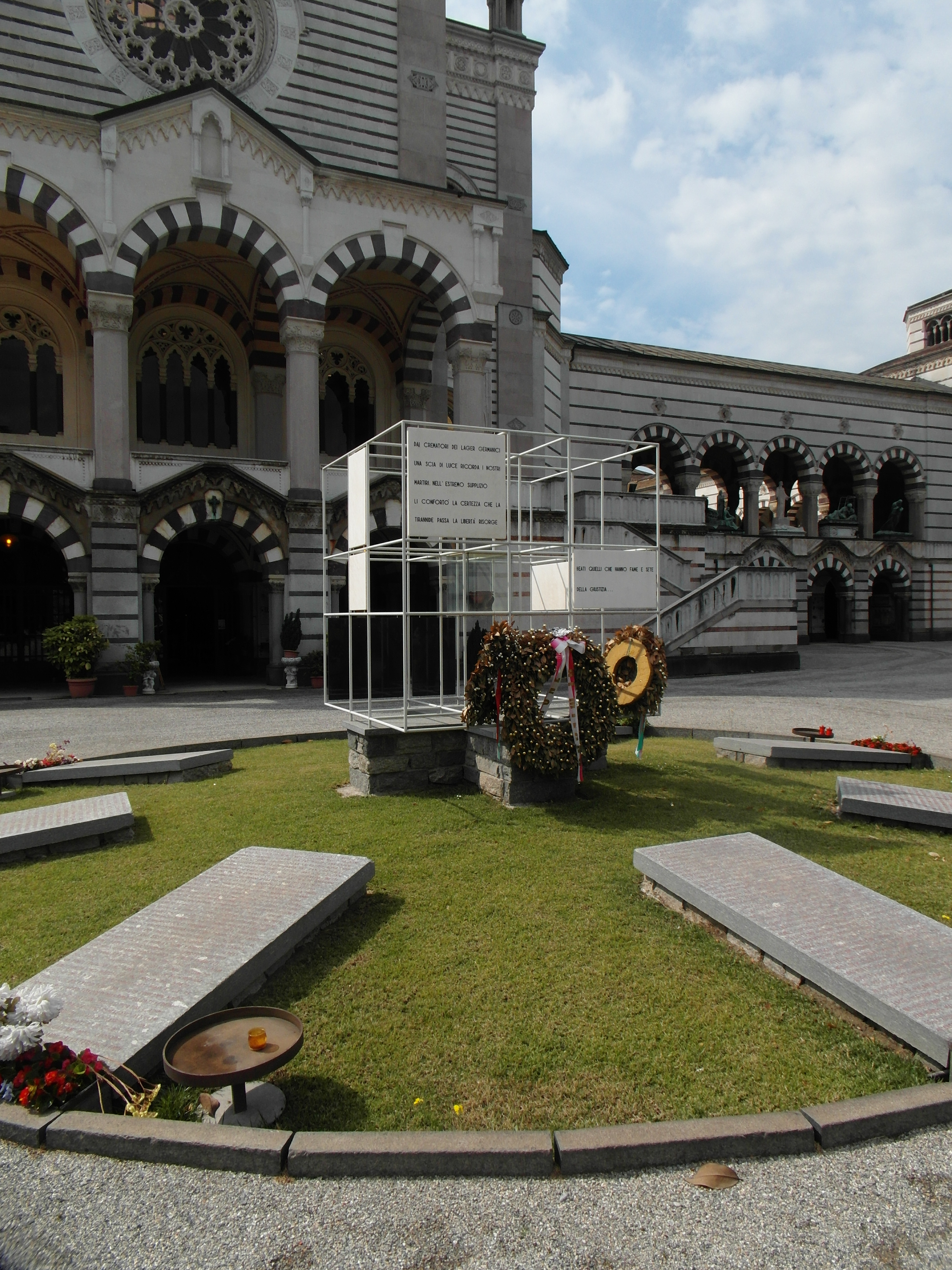
Memorial to Milanese killed in Nazi concentration camps, by the architects BBPR

=== Other famous graves ===
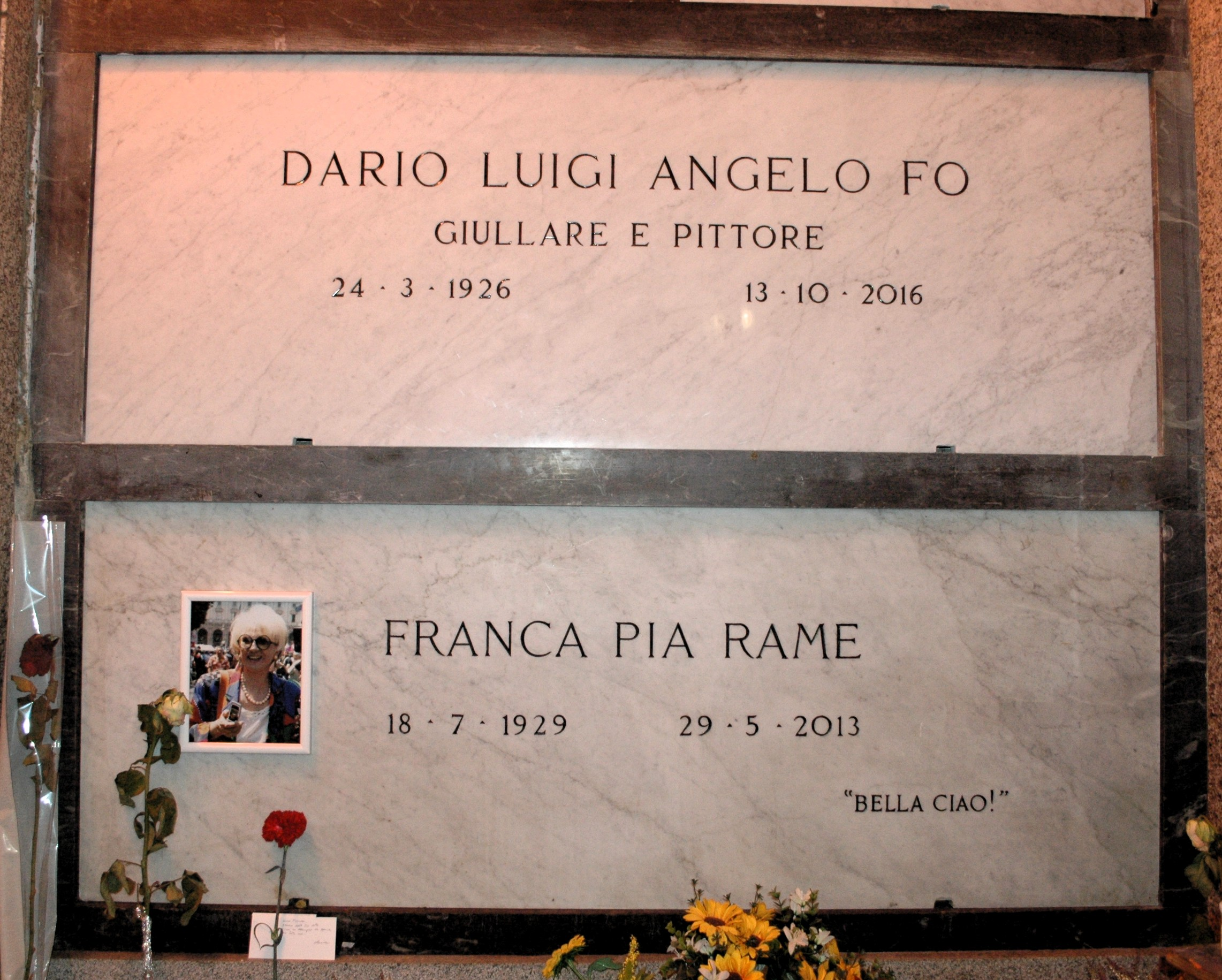
Dario Fo and Franca Rame

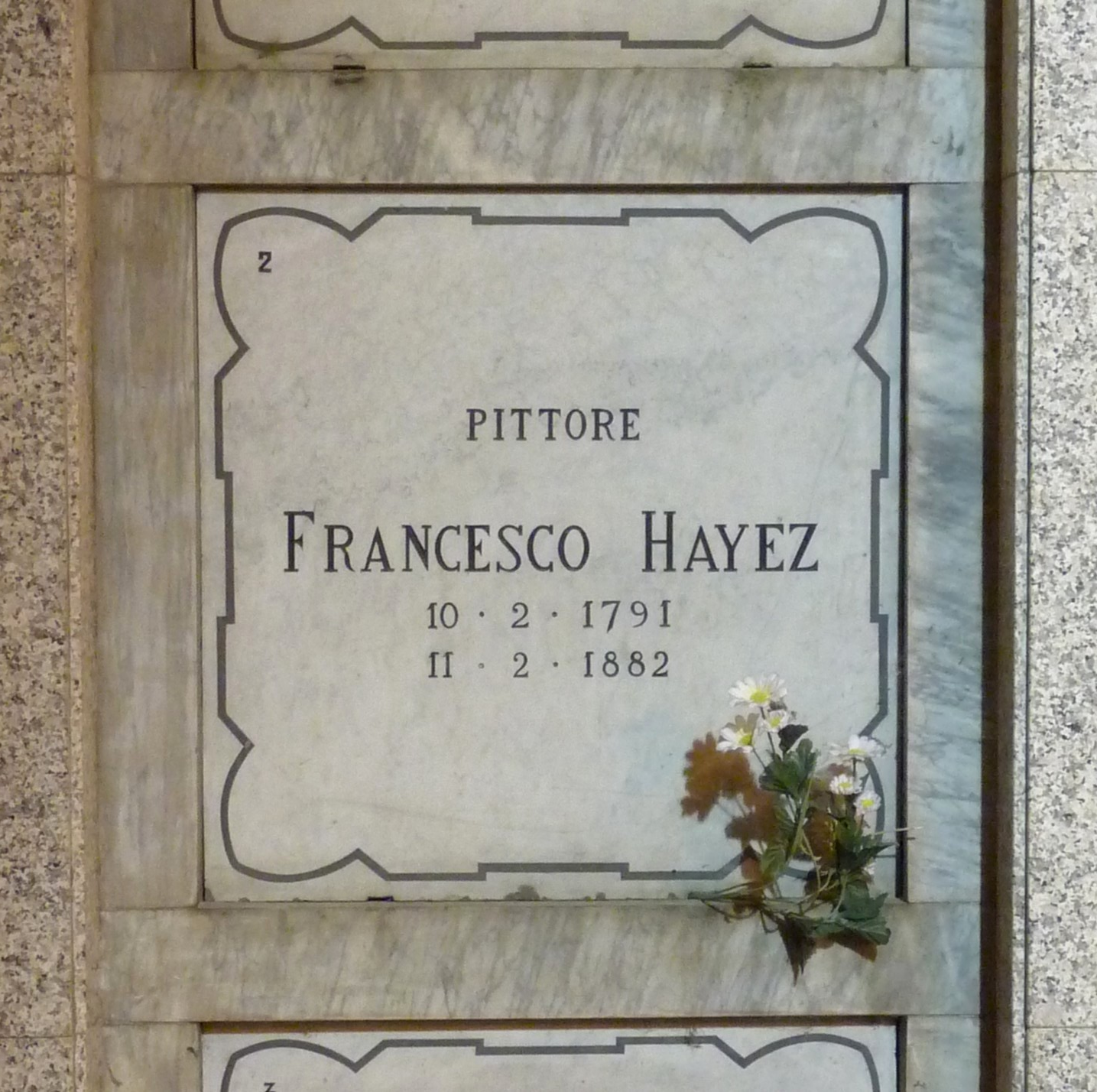
Francesco Hayez

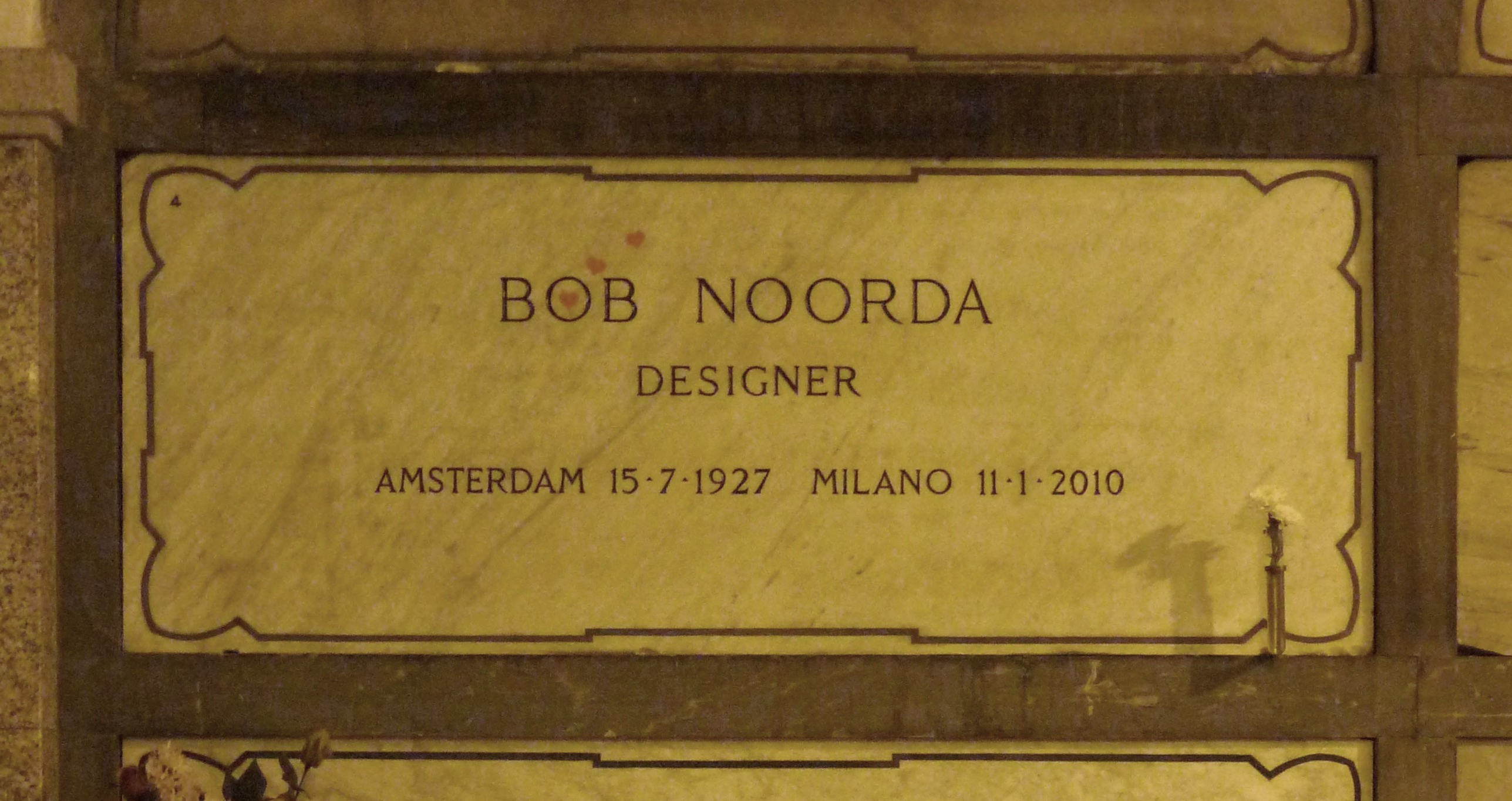
Bob Noorda

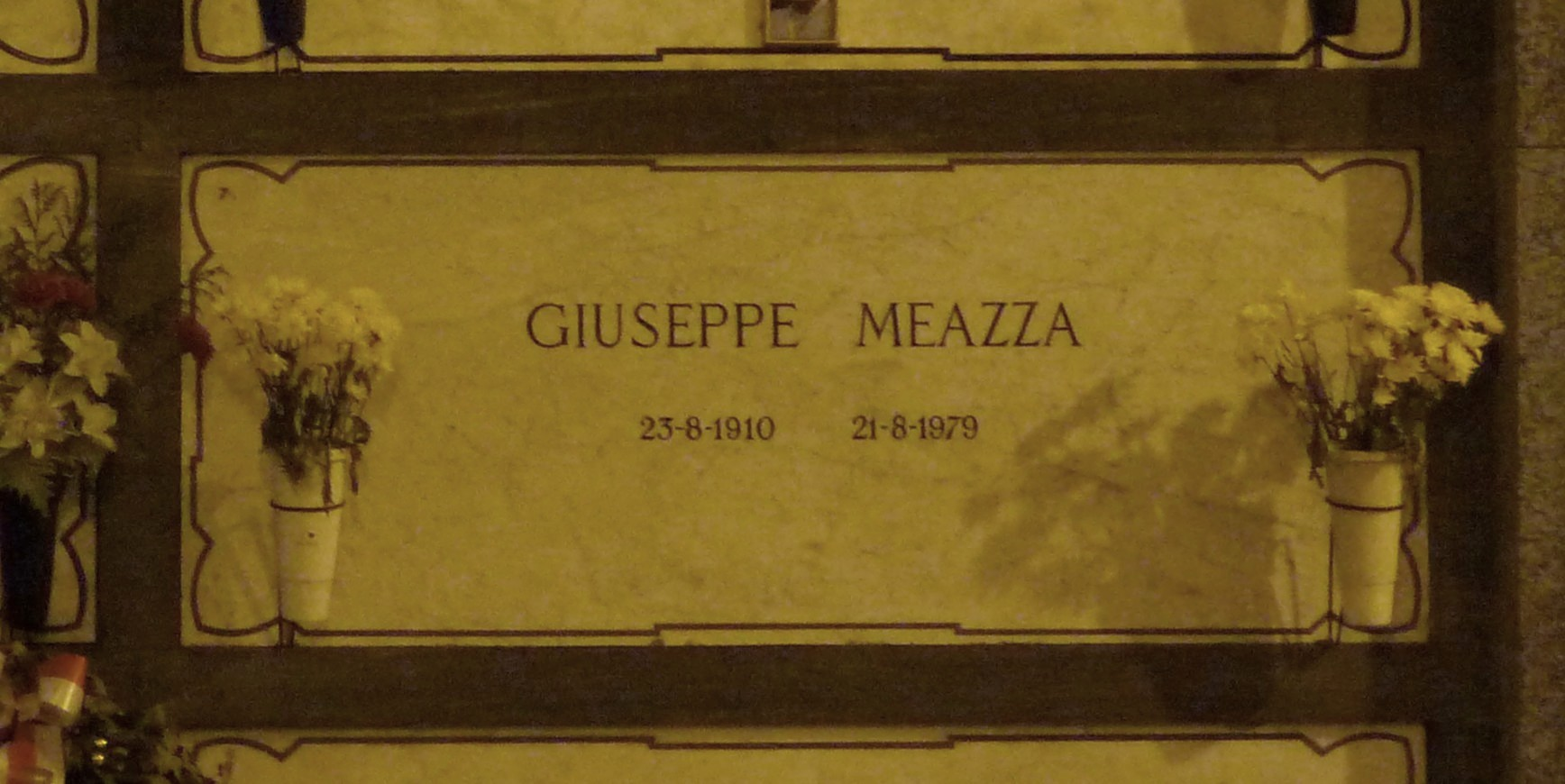
Giuseppe Meazza

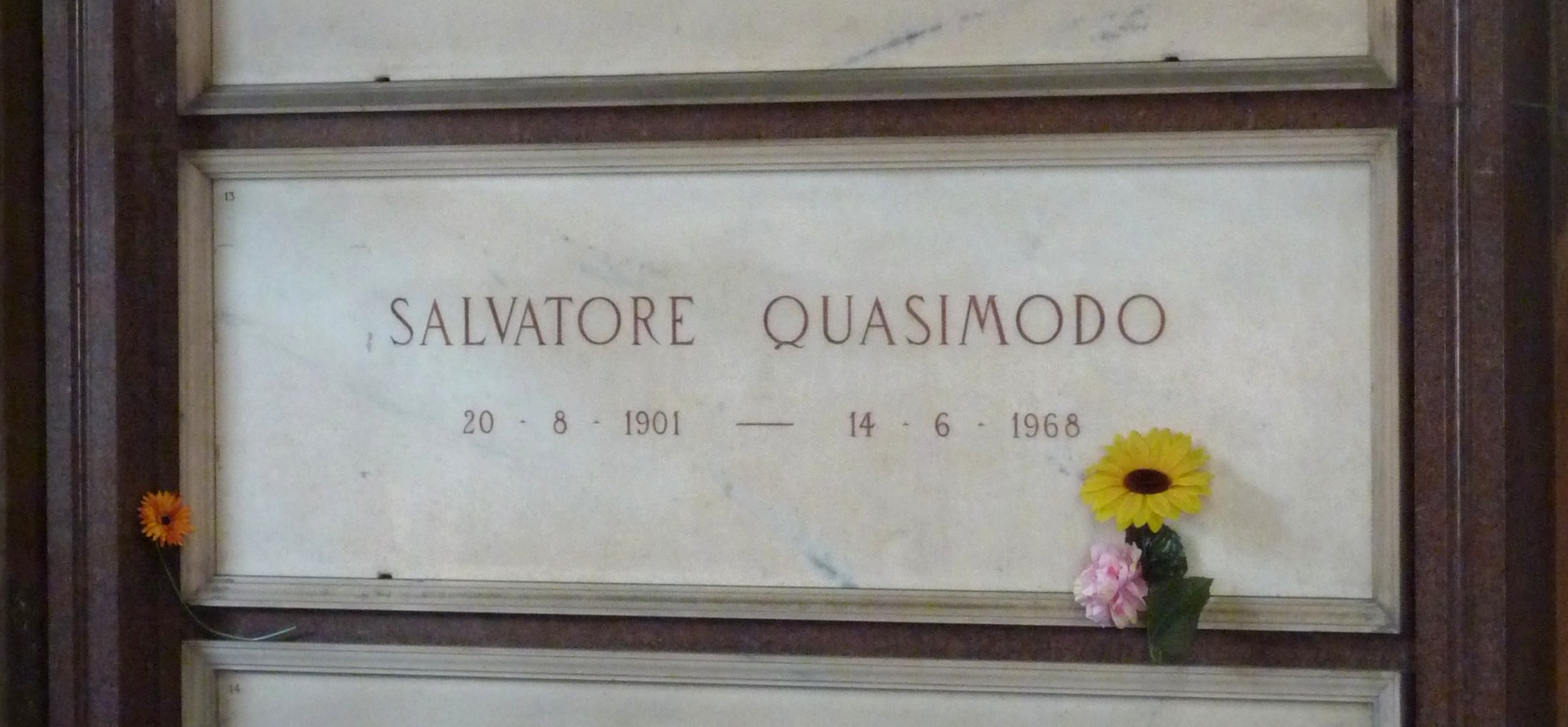
Salvatore Quasimodo

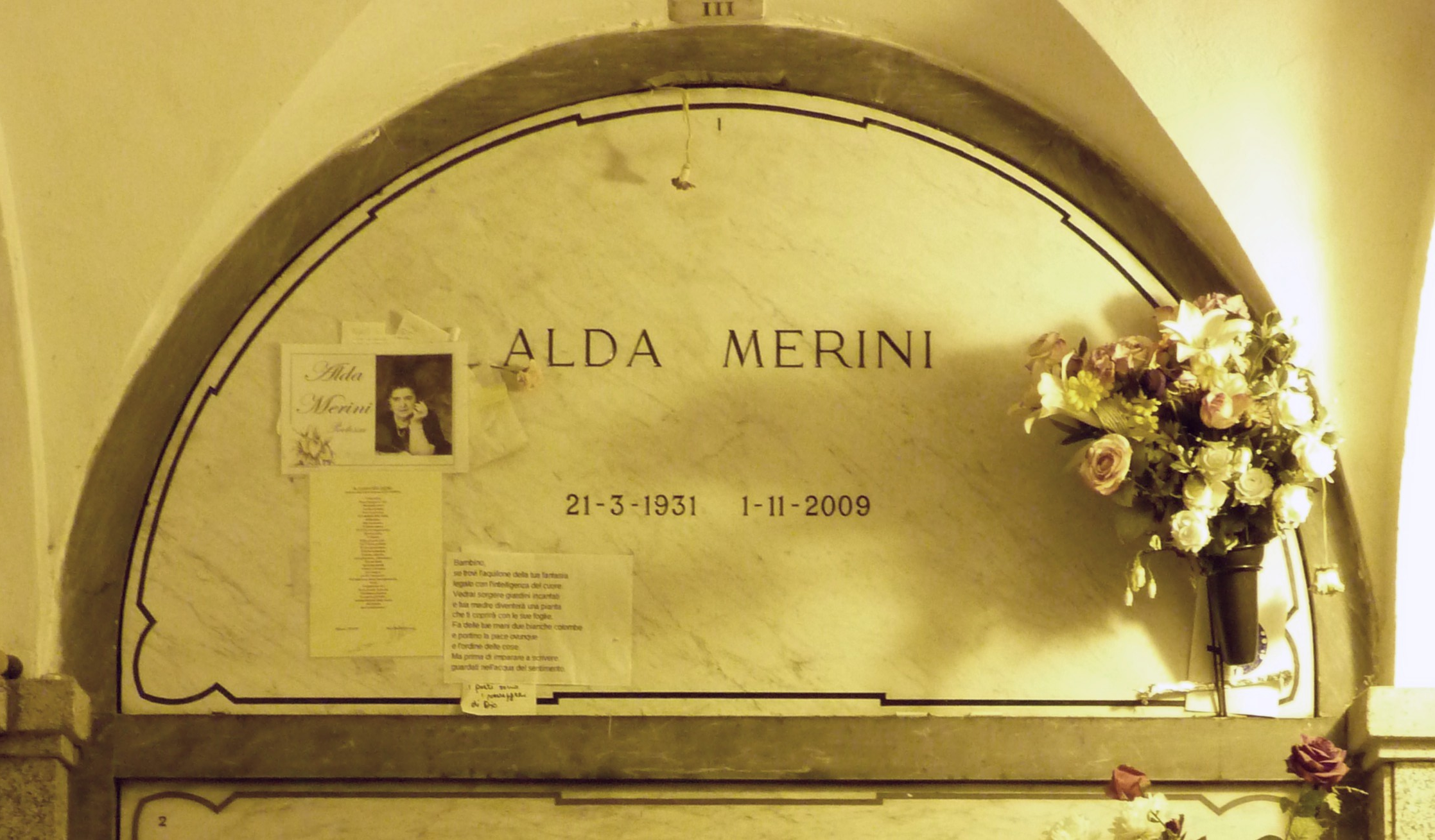
Alda Merini

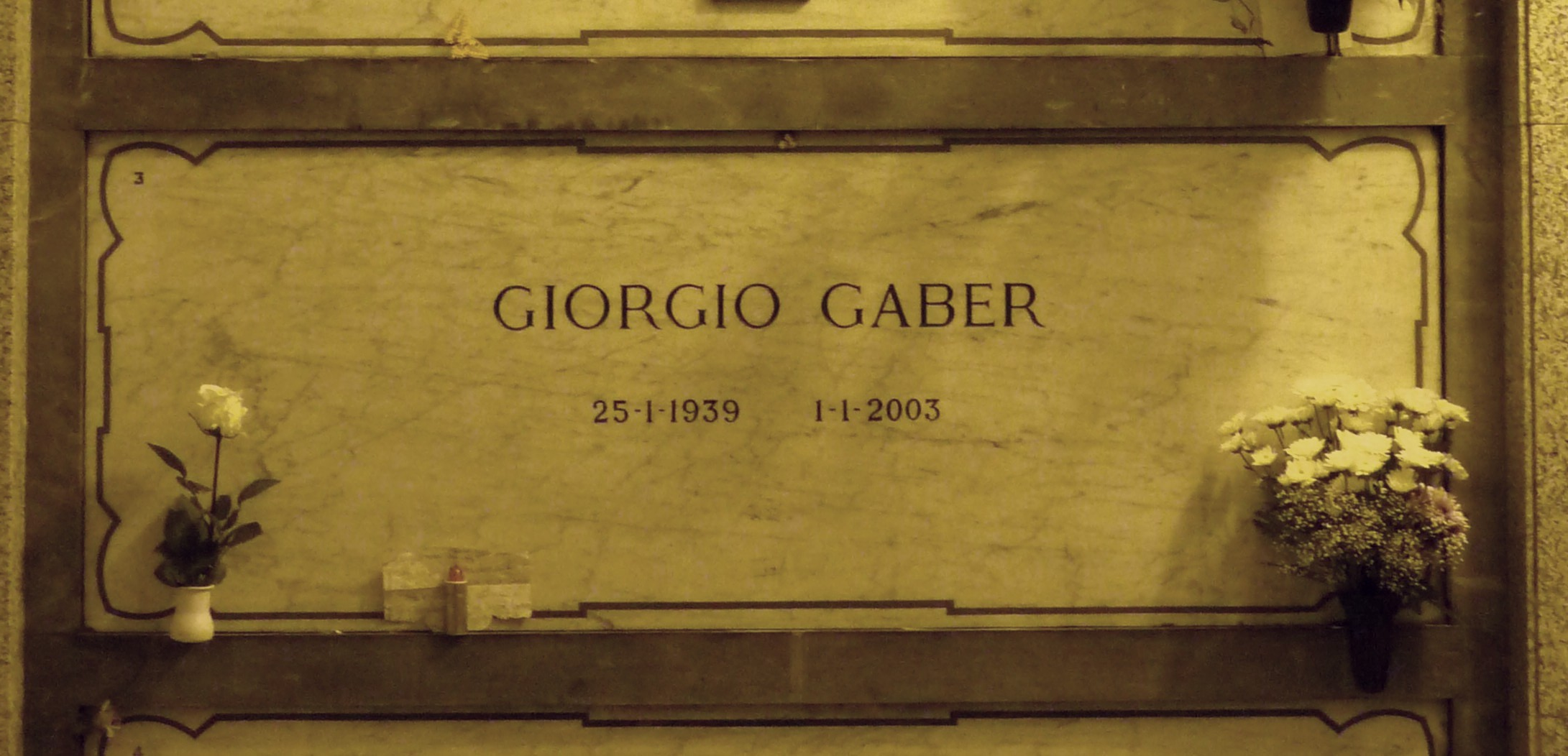
Giorgio Gaber

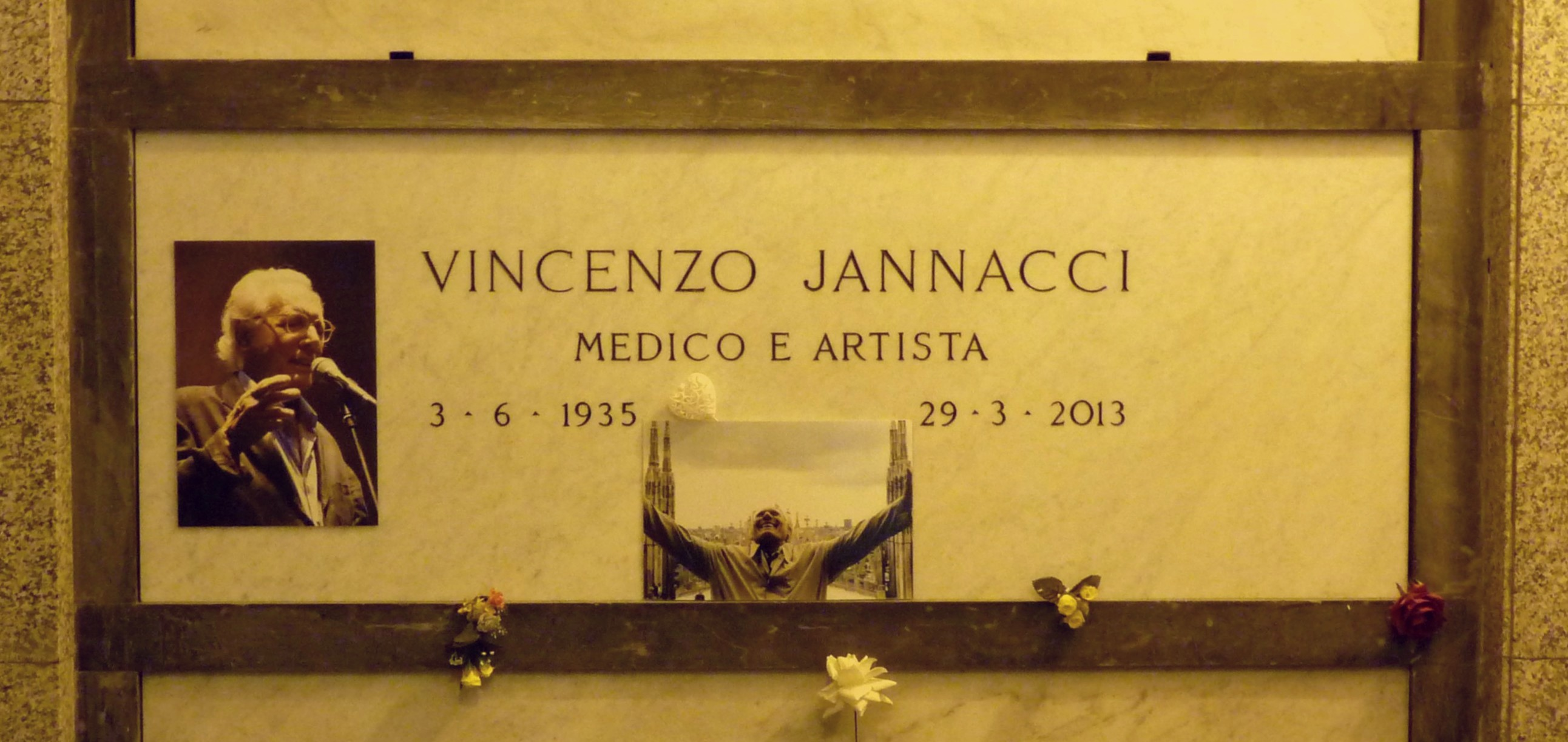
Enzo Jannacci

== See also ==
- Media related to Cimitero Monumentale (Milan) at Wikimedia Commons (Gallery)
- Media related to Cimitero Monumentale (Milan) at Wikimedia Commons (Category)
- Monumental Cemetery of Staglieno, in Genoa
- Certosa di Bologna, the site of the city's monumental cemetery
- Monumental Cemetery of Bonaria in Sardinia
- List of burial places of classical musicians
