= List of burial places of classical musicians =

External image
- Allegri

This list is a collection of the final resting sites of notable composers and musicians in the history of classical music. It includes photographs of the graves alongside notes providing some context or additional information. In cases where the grave has not been preserved or has been lost, the list includes the current location of the tombstone, plaque or memorial commemorating the burial place of the respective classical musician, if such a commemoration exists. The list is limited to composers, conductors, instrumentalists and other figures of significant fame, notability or importance in the classical music tradition who also have current Wikipedia articles. This is not an exhaustive list.

== Known burial places ==
The list can be sorted by clicking on the corresponding arrows in the column titles.

Name	Death	Occupation	Final known burial place	Images	Notes
Claudio Abbado	2014	Conductor	Reformierte Kirche Fex Crasta, Sils im Engadin/Segl, Switzerland		Ten months after his death the urn containing his remains was buried in a cemetery belonging to a 15th-century church in Sils-Maria, a village in the Swiss canton of Graubünden where Abbado had a vacation home. (Note: It's also the place where Friedrich Nietzsche, who also had a vacation home there, got the inspiration for his concept of Eternal return.)
Carl Friedrich Abel	1787	Composer	St. Pancras Old Churchyard, London, England		He was buried in the churchyard of St. Pancras Old Church. As of December 2024 there is no memorial commemorating the composer in the cemetery.
Peter Abelard	1142	Composer	Cimetière du Père-Lachaise, Paris, France		Initially buried at the Abbey of St. Marcel, Abelard's remains were secretly moved to the Abbey of the Paraclete, where his lover Héloïse later joined him in 1163. Their remains were relocated multiple times before being transferred in 1817 to Père Lachaise, making their monument a popular site for visitors who, by tradition, leave letters at their tomb as a tribute or in hopes of finding love. The Abbey of the Paraclete claims the couple's true burial place is at the Paraclete, with the Père Lachaise tomb being a cenotaph.
Isaac Albéniz	1909	Composer	Cementiri de Montjuïc, Barcelona, Spain		
Hugo Alfvén	1960	Composer, violinist	Leksand Cemetery, Leksand, Sweden		
Charles-Valentin Alkan	1888	Composer	Cimetière de Montmartre, Paris, France		His death has been wrongly linked to a falling bookcase reaching for a Talmud volume. Pianist Isidor Philipp circulated this story, but contemporary evidence suggests Alkan fainted in his kitchen under a heavy coat rack, possibly causing it to fall. He was found moaning and was carried to his bedroom where he later died.
Gregorio Allegri	1652	Composer	Santa Maria in Vallicella, Rome, Italy		He was buried in a tomb reserved for members of the Sistine Chapel Choir, located in the church of Santa Maria in Vallicella, also known as Chiesa Nuova. The tombstone bore the canon Cantabimus canticum novum, composed by Allegri in 1640. While the tombstone was lost during subsequent church restorations, its design has been preserved. In 1782, a memorial stone was placed at the site, inscribed with the words: "The Pontifical Singers, so that the harmonious melody that united them in life would not be dissolved by the discord of bodily death, wished to be buried together here".
Leroy Anderson	1975	Composer	New North Cemetery, Woodbury, US	External image: Anderson	
Victoria de los Ángeles	2005	Opera singer	Cementiri de Montjuïc, Barcelona, Spain		She was buried in the family grave of her husband and former manager Enrique Magriñá.
Anton Arensky	1906	Composer	Tikhvin Cemetery, Saint Petersburg, Russia		
Claudio Arrau	1991	Pianist	Cementerio Municipal de Chillán, Chillán, Chile		He died in Murzzuschlag, Austria. His wish was to be buried in his hometown, and following his death the idea of a Patio de Artistas (Artists' Courtyard) was born to honor various local artists.
Kurt Atterberg	1974	Composer	Norra begravningsplatsen, Solna, Sweden		
Daniel Auber	1871	Composer	Cimetière du Père-Lachaise, Paris, France		
Charles Avison	1770	Composer	St Andrew's Church, Newcastle upon Tyne, England		
Carl Philipp Emanuel Bach	1788	Composer	Hauptkirche Sankt Michaelis, Hamburg, Germany		
Johann Christian Bach	1782	Composer	St. Pancras Old Churchyard, London, England		
Johann Sebastian Bach	1750	Composer	Thomaskirche, Leipzig, Germany		Initially buried at Alter Johannisfriedhof in Leipzig. His grave went unmarked for nearly 150 years. In 1894 his coffin was finally discovered and reburied in a vault within the Johanniskirche. This building was destroyed by Allied bombing during World War II, and in 1950 Bach's remains were taken to their present resting place at Leipzig's Thomaskirche.
Wilhelm Backhaus	1969	Pianist	Melaten cemetery, Cologne, Germany		Backhaus suffered a sudden spell of weakness during his final concert at Ossiach Abbey on 28 June 1969. He died in a hospital in Villach on 5 July and was buried in the Herzberg family grave at Melaten cemetery.
Mily Balakirev	1910	Composer, pianist	Tikhvin Cemetery, Saint Petersburg, Russia		
Samuel Barber	1981	Composer	Oaklands Cemetery, West Goshen Township, US		The plot on the right had been purchased for Gian Carlo Menotti; as he did not use it, a stone marked "To the Memory of Two Friends" was placed there instead.
John Barbirolli	1970	Conductor	St Mary's Catholic Cemetery, London, England		He was cremated and his ashes were buried in his parents grave.
Béla Bartók	1945	Composer	Farkasréti Cemetery, Budapest, Hungary		His body was moved to Budapest in 1989 after the fall of the Iron Curtain, as he died and was buried in exile in the United States.
Ettore Bastianini	1967	Opera singer	Cimitero del Laterino, Siena, Italy		
Mattia Battistini	1928	Opera singer	Villa Battistini at Collebaccaro, Contigliano, Italy	External image: Battistini	Battistini planned to adapt his family villa into an ideal retreat for himself and his wife, the Spanish noblewoman Dolores Figueroa y Solis. The villa itself was rebuilt and decorated with frescoes by the famous local painter Antonino Calcagnadoro. A chapel was erected nearby in the Neo-Gothic style and was designed to house the tombs of Dolores and Mattia.
Arnold Bax	1953	Composer	St. Finbarr's Cemetery, Cork, Ireland	External image: Bax	
Amy Beach	1944	Composer	Forest Hills Cemetery, Boston, US	External image: Beach	
Ludwig van Beethoven	1827	Composer	Wiener Zentralfriedhof, Vienna, Austria		In 1863, 36 years after his death, his body was exhumed for study. In 1888 his remains were moved to the Zentralfriedhof. Beethoven's first burial place was at the Währinger Ortsfriedhof, which turned into the Schubertpark in 1925, where his former tombstone still stands next to Schubert's old grave.
Vincenzo Bellini	1835	Composer	Cattedrale di Sant'Agata, Catania, Italy		The phrase "Ah! non credea mirarti / Sì presto estinto, o fiore" (I did not believe you would fade so soon, oh flower) from his opera La sonnambula is inscribed on the tomb. He was initially buried in Père Lachaise Cemetery in Paris, where a cenotaph still stands in his honor.
Carl Michael Bellman	1795	Composer	Klara kyrka, Stockholm, Sweden		He was buried in the churchyard with no gravestone, in a place now lost. In 1855 a memorial was erected in the churchyard by the Swedish Academy.
William Sterndale Bennett	1875	Composer	Westminster Abbey, London, England		
Alban Berg	1935	Composer	Friedhof Hietzing, Vienna, Austria		
Carlo Bergonzi	2014	Opera singer	Cimitero di Vidalenzo, Parma, Italy	External image: Bergonzi	
Hector Berlioz	1869	Composer	Cimetière de Montmartre, Paris, France		
Leonard Bernstein	1990	Composer, conductor, pianist	Green-Wood Cemetery Brooklyn, New York, US		He is buried next to his wife Felicia Montealegre and with a copy of Mahler's Fifth Symphony.
Franz Berwald	1868	Composer	Norra begravningsplatsen, Solna, Sweden		
Heinrich Ignaz Franz Biber	1704	Composer	Petersfriedhof Salzburg, Salzburg, Austria		A monument was erected in his honour in his hometown Stráž pod Ralskem (called Wartenberg until 1946).
Gilles Binchois	1460	Composer	Church of Saint-Vincent, Soignies, Belgium		In 1960, a commemorative ceremony was held at the church to mark the 500th anniversary of his death. A plaque commemorating this event was subsequently installed at the nearby Académie de Musique, known as "La Chantrerie." As of January 2025 there is no memorial commemorating the composer in the church.
Hildegard of Bingen	1179	Composer	Eibingen Abbey, Rüdesheim am Rhein, Germany		She was buried at the Rupertsberg Monastery, but her remains were moved to Eibingen Abbey after the monastery was destroyed during the Thirty Years' War.
Georges Bizet	1875	Composer	Cimetière du Père-Lachaise, Paris, France		In 2006 the bust on top of the tomb was stolen. It has since been recovered and is in the possession of the cemetery.
Jussi Björling	1960	Opera singer	Stora Tuna Cemetery, Borlänge, Sweden		
John Blow	1708	Composer	Westminster Abbey, London, England		
Luigi Boccherini	1805	Composer	Chiesa di San Francesco, Lucca, Italy	External image: Boccherini	He was buried in the Pontifical Basilica of St. Michael in Madrid until 1927, when an agreement between Miguel Primo de Rivera and Benito Mussolini allowed his remains to be repatriated to his native Lucca.
Karl Böhm	1981	Conductor	Steinfeld Friedhof, Graz, Austria		
Arrigo Boito	1918	Librettist, composer	Cimitero Monumentale, Milan, Italy		The tomb also contains the mortal remains of his brother, Camillo Boito.
Celestina Boninsegna	1947	Opera singer	Cimitero Nuovo, Sassuolo, Italy	External image: Boninsegna	
Leo Borchard	1945	Conductor	Friedhof Steglitz, Berlin, Germany		He was accidentally killed when the driver of the car in which he was traveling failed to stop at a checkpoint in Berlin.
Alexander Borodin	1887	Composer	Tikhvin Cemetery, Saint Petersburg, Russia		
Dmytro Bortniansky	1825	Composer	Tikhvin Cemetery, Saint Petersburg, Russia		Initually buried at the Smolensky Cemetery in St. Petersburg, his remains were transferred to the Tikhvin Cemetery in the 20th century.
Lili Boulanger	1918	Composer	Cimetière de Montmartre, Paris, France		She suffered from chronic illness and died at the early age of 24.
Nadia Boulanger	1979	Music teacher, conductor, composer	Cimetière de Montmartre, Paris, France		She was buried in the same tomb as her sister Lili and their parents.
Pierre Boulez	2016	Composer	Hauptfriedhof Baden-Baden, Baden-Baden, Germany		
Johannes Brahms	1897	Composer	Wiener Zentralfriedhof, Vienna, Austria		The monument was designed by Victor Horta and the sculpture was made by Ilse von Twardowski.
Alfred Brendel	2025	Pianist	St John-at-Hampstead churchyard, London, England	Upload photo	His funeral was held at St John’s Hampstead following his death in June 2025.
George Bridgetower	1860	Violinist	Kensal Green Cemetery, London, England	External image: Bridgetower	He was buried in the catacombs of the cemetery. His tomb erroneously states he died "aged 78 years" when, in fact, he lived to be 81 years old.
Benjamin Britten	1976	Composer	St Peter and St Paul's Church, Aldeburgh, England		Peter Pears, English tenor and Britten's partner, died in Aldeburgh on 1986 and was buried beside Britten.
Carlo Broschi (Farinelli)	1782	Opera singer	Cimitero della Certosa di Bologna, Bologna, Italy		His original place of burial was destroyed during the Napoleonic Wars, and in 1810 Farinelli's great-niece Maria Carlotta Pisani had his remains transferred to the cemetery of La Certosa. Farinelli's remains were disinterred from the Certosa cemetery on 12 July 2006, in order to conduct bio-medical research on them.
Max Bruch	1920	Composer	Alter St.-Matthäus-Kirchhof, Berlin, Germany		His daughter Margaretha carved on the gravestone "Musik ist die Sprache Gottes" (Music is the language of God).
Anton Bruckner	1896	Composer	Stift Sankt Florian, Sankt Florian, Austria		At his own request, Bruckner was buried in the crypt directly beneath the great organ. On the pedestal of the sarcophagus is the inscription "Non confundar in aeternum" (In eternity I will not be ashamed), the closing line of his Te Deum.
Alan Bush	1995	Composer	Golders Green Crematorium, London, England	External image: Bush	
Ferruccio Busoni	1924	Composer, pianist	Städtischer Friedhof III, Berlin, Germany		
Dieterich Buxtehude	1707	Composer	Marienkirche, Lübeck, Germany		He was entombed in the Marienkirche, which was gutted by Allied bombing in 1942. A plaque marks the approximate spot of his resting place.
William Byrd	1623	Composer	St. Peter and St. Paul Churchyard, Stondon Massey, England		He was buried in St. Peter's and St. Paul's churchyard, in an unmarked plot of unconsecrated ground. In 1923, on the 300th anniversary of Byrd's death, a cenotaph was built there in his honor.
Montserrat Caballé	2018	Opera singer	Cementiri de Sant Andreu, Barcelona, Spain	External image: Caballé	
Giulio Caccini	1618	Composer	Basilica della Santissima Annunziata, Florence, Italy		The floor of the basilica was completely redone in the years 1783–1795 and the graves were removed. Riccardo Gandolfi's attempt in 1896 to locate Caccini's tomb was unsuccessful, which was documented in his article published in Rivista Musicale Italiana. As of August 2024 there is no memorial commemorating the composer in the basilica. The facade of the church was added in 1601 by Giulio Caccini's brother, Giovanni, imitating the Renaissance-style of Brunelleschi's facade of the Ospedale degli Innocenti, which defines the eastern side of the piazza.
Maria Callas	1977	Opera singer	Cimetière du Père-Lachaise, Paris, France		Her ashes were originally buried in the cemetery. After being stolen and later recovered, they were scattered into the Aegean Sea, off the coast of Greece. The empty urn remains in the Père Lachaise's columbarium.
Giacomo Carissimi	1674	Composer	Basilica di Sant'Apollinare, Rome, Italy		He spent his last years as maestro di capella at Sant'Apollinare. His tomb was destroyed when the church was completely rebuilt in the 1740s. His tomb is presumably lost. As of August 2024 there is no memorial commemorating the composer in the church.
Enrico Caruso	1921	Opera singer	Cimitero di Santa Maria del Pianto, Naples, Italy	External image: Caruso	His crystal casket was taken to Del Pianto Cemetery and placed in a temporary chapel with continued viewing that lasted for eight years until his widow put a stop to the spectacle and sealed the vault. His body was re-dressed each year with a new suit.
Pau Casals	1973	Cellist, composer, conductor	Cementiri del Vendrell, El Vendrell, Spain		
Alfredo Catalani	1893	Composer	Cimitero di Sant'Anna, Lucca, Italy		He was initially buried in Milan's Cimitero Monumentale, but his remains were moved to his native Lucca in 1894.
Francesco Cavalli	1676	Composer	Chiesa di San Lorenzo, Venice, Italy		He was buried alongside his sisters and his wife in the tomb of the bishop of Pula, his wife's uncle, Claudio Sozomeno. His tomb is presumably lost. As of August 2024 there is no memorial commemorating the composer in the church.
Feodor Chaliapin	1938	Opera singer	Novodevichye Cemetery, Moscow, Russia		He died in Paris and was buried in the Batignolles Cemetery, where his old tomb still stands. In 1984 his remains were moved to Moscow.
Cécile Chaminade	1944	Composer	Cimetière de Passy, Paris, France		She was initially buried in Monte Carlo, Monaco. Her grave was later moved to the Cimitière de Passy in Paris.
Ruperto Chapí	1909	Composer	Cementerio de Villena, Villena, Spain		Initially buried in Cementerio de San Justo in Madrid, his remains were transferred to his hometown Villena in 2003. The original tomb still stands in Madrid.
Gustave Charpentier	1956	Composer	Cimetière du Père-Lachaise, Paris, France		
Luigi Cherubini	1842	Composer	Cimetière du Père-Lachaise, Paris, France		His tomb was designed by the architect Achille Leclère and includes a figure by the sculptor Augustin-Alexandre Dumont representing "Music" crowning a bust of the composer with a wreath.
Frédéric Chopin	1849	Composer	Cimetière du Père-Lachaise, Paris, France		His heart is entombed within a pillar at the Holy Cross Church in Warsaw. His sister, having learned from her brother's deathbed his wish that his body should return to Poland, smuggled the heart to Warsaw preserved in cognac.
Francesco Cilea	1950	Composer	Cilea Memorial Mausoleum, Palmi, Italy		In 1962 the municipality of Palmi built an imposing mausoleum in his honor; inside it houses a crypt decorated with mosaics, where his remains and his wife's are kept.
Muzio Clementi	1832	Composer	Westminster Abbey, London, England		
Van Cliburn	2013	Pianist	Greenwood Memorial Park, Fort Worth, US		His tomb is located in the mausoleum called Independence Chapel, behind the statue of Alexander Hamilton.
Isabella Colbran	1845	Opera singer	Cimitero della Certosa di Bologna, Bologna, Italy		She was the muse and first wife of composer Gioachino Rossini, and lived with Rossini's father until her death. She is buried next to his father and Rossini's parents.
Samuel Coleridge-Taylor	1912	Composer	Bandon Hill Cemetery, Wallington, England		
Aaron Copland	1990	Composer	Tanglewood Music Center, Lenox, US		His ashes were scattered over the Tanglewood Music Center near Lenox, Massachusetts. A monument honoring him is located in the formal garden on the grounds of Tanglewood Music Center, in the same area where the composer's ashes were scattered. There also is a plaque showing the initial trumpet notes from his Fanfare for the Common Man.
Arcangelo Corelli	1713	Composer	Pantheon, Rome, Italy		
Franco Corelli	2003	Opera singer	Cimitero Monumentale, Milan, Italy		
Peter Cornelius	1874	Composer	Hauptfriedhof Mainz, Mainz, Germany		
Alfred Cortot	1962	Pianist	Cimetière de Le Villars, Le Villars, France		
César Cui	1918	Composer	Tikhvin Cemetery, Saint Petersburg, Russia		
Carl Czerny	1857	Composer	Wiener Zentralfriedhof, Vienna, Austria		
György Cziffra	1994	Pianist	Senlis Cemetery, Senlis-le-Sec, France		
Claude Debussy	1918	Composer	Cimetière de Passy, Paris, France		He died on March 25, 1918, amidst the turmoil of World War I while Paris was subjected to ongoing aerial bombardments by German forces. The situation did not permit a public funeral with customary honors.
Léo Delibes	1891	Composer	Cimetière de Montmartre, Paris, France		
Frederick Delius	1934	Composer	St Peter Churchyard, Limpsfield, England		
Anton Diabelli	1858	Music publisher, composer	Sankt Marxer Friedhof, Vienna, Austria		
Carl Ditters von Dittersdorf	1799	Composer	Deštná Cemetery, Deštná, Czech Republic		
Ernst von Dohnányi	1960	Composer, pianist, conductor	Roselawn Cemetery, Tallahassee, US		
Gaetano Donizetti	1848	Composer	Santa Maria Maggiore, Bergamo, Italy		
John Dowland	1626	Composer	St Ann Blackfriars, London, England	External image: Dowland	The church was destroyed in the Great Fire of London and it was not rebuilt. The site of the church was retained for burials and the church's existing burial ground continued in use. Both graveyards were closed to burials in 1849 and are now public gardens, still containing several tombstones. As of December 2024 there is no memorial commemorating the composer in the area.
Carl Wilhelm Drescher	1925	Composer, violinist	Wiener Zentralfriedhof, Vienna, Austria		
Guillaume Dufay	1474	Composer	Old Cambrai Cathedral, Cambrai, France		He was buried in the chapel of St. Étienne in the cathedral of Cambrai. After the destruction of the cathedral during the French Revolution the tomb was lost, but the original tombstone was found in 1859 being used to cover a well and now is in the Palais des Beaux Arts in Lille. As of August 2024 there is no memorial commemorating the composer in the new Cambrai Cathedral.
Paul Dukas	1935	Composer	Cimetière du Père-Lachaise, Paris, France		He was cremated and his ashes were placed in the columbarium at Père Lachaise.
John Dunstaple	1453	Composer	St Stephen Walbrook, London, England	External image: Dunstaple	The grave was lost when the church was destroyed in the Great Fire of London. The wording of the epitaph had been recorded in the early 17th century, and a memorial was erected in the church in 1904.
Henri Dutilleux	2013	Composer	Cimetière du Montparnasse, Paris, France		He was buried alongside his wife, the pianist Geneviève Joy.
Antonín Dvořák	1904	Composer	Vyšehrad Cemetery, Prague, Czech Republic		
Gottfried von Einem	1996	Composer	Friedhof Hietzing, Vienna, Austria		
Hanns Eisler	1962	Composer	Dorotheenstädtischer Friedhof, Berlin, Germany		
Edward Elgar	1934	Composer	St Wulstan's Roman Catholic Church, Little Malvern, England		He had colorectal cancer that couldn't be treated. He told his doctor, Arthur Thomson, that he had no faith in an afterlife: "I believe there is nothing but complete oblivion."
George Enescu	1955	Composer, violinist	Cimetière du Père-Lachaise, Paris, France		
Heinrich Wilhelm Ernst	1865	Violinist, composer	Cimetière du Château, Nice, France		
Manuel de Falla	1946	Composer	Catedral de Cádiz, Cádiz, Spain		After traveling to Buenos Aires to conduct concerts, he decided to stay in Argentina as an exile due to the rise of Franco in Spain and the outbreak of World War II in Europe. He died in poverty at his home in Alta Gracia, just before his 70th birthday. Initially buried in the St. Jerome Cemetery in Córdoba, his remains were later brought back to Spain in 1947 by Franco and given a state funeral.
Louise Farrenc	1875	Composer	Cimetière du Montparnasse, Paris, France		She was buried alongside her father Jacques-Edme Dumont, her brother Auguste Dumont and her husband Aristide Farrenc in the 10th division of Cimetière du Montparnasse.
Gabriel Fauré	1924	Composer	Cimetière de Passy, Paris, France		
John Field	1837	Composer	Vvedenskoye Cemetery, Moscow, Russia		
Edwin Fischer	1960	Pianist	Friedhof Friedental, Luzern, Switzerland		
Dietrich Fischer-Dieskau	2012	Opera singer	Friedhof Heerstraße, Berlin, Germany		
Miguel Fleta	1938	Opera singer	Cementerio de Torrero, Zaragoza, Spain		
Friedrich von Flotow	1883	Composer	Alter Friedhof, Darmstadt, Germany		
César Franck	1890	Composer	Cimetière du Montparnasse, Paris, France		The tomb was designed by his friend, architect Gaston Redon. A number of Franck's students, led by Augusta Holmès, commissioned a bronze bust from Auguste Rodin, which in 1893 was placed on the tomb.
Mirella Freni	2020	Opera singer	Cimitero di San Cataldo, Modena, Italy	External image: Freni	
Girolamo Frescobaldi	1643	Composer	Santi Apostoli, Rome, Italy		The tomb was lost during the church's late 18th-century reconstruction. A memorial grave and a plaque were placed in the church in his honor.
Ferenc Fricsay	1963	Conductor	Ermatinger Friedhof, Ermatingen, Switzerland		On the initiative of his daughter, his grave was declared a memorial site by the city.
Johann Jakob Froberger	1667	Composer	Château d'Héricourt, Héricourt, France		The castle was dismantled in the 18th century and only the main tower remains. A memorial was erected in his memory.
Julius Fučík	1916	Composer	Vinohrady Cemetery, Prague, Czech Republic		
Wilhelm Furtwängler	1954	Conductor, composer	Bergfriedhof Heidelberg, Heidelberg, Germany		
Giovanni Gabrieli	1612	Composer	Chiesa di Santo Stefano, Venice, Italy		
Niels Gade	1890	Composer	Holmens Kirke, Copenhagen, Denmark		
Manuel García	1832	Opera singer, composer	Cimetière du Père-Lachaise, Paris, France		
Julián Gayarre	1890	Opera singer	Cementerio de El Roncal, Roncal, Spain		His larynx was preserved and studied by specialists interested in understanding the physical basis of his exceptional vocal abilities, and is now on display in a museum located in his hometown, Roncal. In 1901, his grave was embellished with a marble and bronze monument made by the sculptor Mariano Benlliure, who enjoyed a close friendship with Gayarre. (Note: The front displays a figure of Music in mourning, while an opera curtain hangs symbolically on the opposite side. The upper part, cast in bronze, showcases allegorical figures of Harmony and Melody carrying the tenor's figurative coffin.)
Nicolai Gedda	2017	Opera singer	Galärvarvskyrkogården, Stockholm, Sweden	—N/a	He died after a heart attack at his home in Tolochenaz in the canton of Vaud, Switzerland. His death was not announced by his family until one month later, 9 February 2017. He was buried in an unmarked memorial plot (minneslund) in Galärvarvskyrkogården. As of December 2024 there is no memorial commemorating the singer in the cemetery.
George Gershwin	1937	Composer	Westchester Hills Cemetery, Hastings-on-Hudson, US		
Carlo Gesualdo	1613	Composer	Chiesa del Gesù Nuovo, Naples, Italy	External image: Gesualdo	
Nicolai Ghiaurov	2004	Opera singer	Cimitero di San Cataldo, Modena, Italy	External image: Ghiaurov	
Orlando Gibbons	1625	Composer	Canterbury Cathedral, Canterbury, England		He died suddenly while travelling to Canterbury to prepare for the reception of Queen Henrietta Maria.
Walter Gieseking	1956	Pianist	Nordfriedhof Wiesbaden, Wiesbaden, Germany	External image: Gieseking	He was a lepidopterist, his private collection can be seen in the Museum Wiesbaden.
Beniamino Gigli	1957	Opera singer	Cimitero Civico Recanati, Recanati, Italy		It was Gigli himself who in 1930 commissioned the work to his brother, Prof. Catervo Gigli, a Fine Arts graduate and sculptor, who designed the family mausoleum inspired by the oldest funerary monuments in history, the pyramids of Egypt.
Emil Gilels	1985	Pianist	Novodevichye Cemetery, Moscow, Russia		
Umberto Giordano	1948	Composer	Cimitero Monumentale, Milan, Italy		
Carlo Maria Giulini	2005	Conductor	Cimitero Comunale di Bolzano, Bolzano, Italy		
Alexander Glazunov	1936	Composer	Tikhvin Cemetery, Saint Petersburg, Russia		
Mikhail Glinka	1857	Composer	Tikhvin Cemetery, Saint Petersburg, Russia		Initially buried in Berlin, four months later his remains were moved to Saint Petersburg for reinterment. There is a memorial in the Russian Orthodox Cemetery, constructed in 1947 by the military of the Soviet occupation sector of Berlin.
Christoph Willibald Gluck	1787	Composer	Wiener Zentralfriedhof, Vienna, Austria		
Tito Gobbi	1984	Opera singer	Cimitero del Verano, Rome, Italy	External image: Gobbi	
Karl Goldmark	1915	Composer	Wiener Zentralfriedhof, Vienna, Austria		
Henryk Górecki	2010	Composer	Sienkiewicza Street Cemetery, Katowice, Poland		
Anna Gottlieb	1856	Opera singer	Sankt Marxer Friedhof, Vienna, Austria		Her tombstone reads "Singer and actress, first performer of Pamina".
Louis Moreau Gottschalk	1869	Composer	Green-Wood Cemetery Brooklyn, New York, US	External image: Gottschalk	He died in Tijuca, Rio de Janeiro. In 1870 his remains were returned to the United States and were interred at the Green-Wood Cemetery. His original burial spot, a marble monument topped by an "Angel of Music" statue, was irreparably damaged by vandals in 1959. In October 2012 a new "Angel of Music" statue was unveiled. The original monument is documented in a stereograph dating from c. 1870.
Glenn Gould	1982	Pianist	Mount Pleasant Cemetery, Toronto, Canada		The first bars of Bach's Goldberg Variations, Gould's signature piece, are engraved on the tombstone.
Charles Gounod	1893	Composer	Cimetière d'Auteuil, Paris, France		
Percy Grainger	1961	Composer	West Terrace Cemetery, Adelaide, Australia		
Edvard Grieg	1907	Composer	Troldhaugen, Bergen, Norway		His ashes were united with his wife's in a cliffside tomb overlooking a fjord near their home at Troldhaugen, situated by Nordåsvannet bay.
Alfred Grünfeld	1924	Pianist	Wiener Zentralfriedhof, Vienna, Austria		He was granted an Ehrengrab by the city of Vienna. The grave memorial was created by the sculptor Josef Müllner.
Francisco Guerrero	1599	Composer	Catedral de Sevilla, Seville, Spain		His tomb is located on the right side of the chapel of the Virgen de la Antigua, below the sarcophagus of Luis de Salcedo y Azcona.
Friedrich Gulda	2000	Pianist	Steinbach am Attersee Cemetery, Steinbach am Attersee, Austria		
Fromental Halévy	1862	Composer	Cimetière de Montmartre, Paris, France		He died leaving his last opera Noé unfinished. It was completed by his former student Georges Bizet, but was not performed until ten years after Bizet's death.
George Frideric Handel	1759	Composer	Westminster Abbey, London, England		During his last years he was completely blind, following an eye surgery performed by the medical charlatan Chevalier John Taylor. He never married, and his will bequeathed the bulk of his estate to his niece Johanna but also distributed much of his estate to other relations, servants, friends and charities. On the wall above his grave, a monument by the sculptor Louis-François Roubiliac was unveiled in 1762.
Nikolaus Harnoncourt	2016	Conductor	Friedhof an der Pfarrkirche, St. Georgen im Attergau, Austria	External image: Harnoncourt	
Clara Haskil	1960	Pianist	Montparnasse Cemetery, Paris, France		Her final public appearance was on 1 December 1960 at the Théâtre des Champs-Élysées with violinist Arthur Grumiaux. Six days later, she died following a fall on the stairs at a railway station in Brussels.
Johann Adolph Hasse	1783	Composer	San Marcuola, Venice, Italy		
Joseph Haydn	1809	Composer	Bergkirche, Eisenstadt, Austria		Haydn's remains were interred in the local Hundsturm cemetery until 1820, when they were moved to Eisenstadt by Prince Nikolaus. In 1932, Prince Paul Esterházy, Nikolaus's descendant, built a marble tomb for Haydn in the Bergkirche in Eisenstadt and his remains were moved there. His head took a different journey; it was stolen by phrenologists shortly after burial, and the skull was reunited with the other remains only in 1954.
Elvira de Hidalgo	1980	Opera singer	Valderrobres Cemetery, Valderrobres, Spain	External image: Hidalgo	She was initially buried in an unidentified grave at Cimitero Maggiore di Milano. Her remains were intended to be moved to a common grave in 1990 upon the expiration of her burial plot, but her pupils and friends funded the relocation of her remains within the same cemetery, with this arrangement set to last until 2020. In 2018, thanks to the efforts of an academic researcher and several Spanish cultural organizations, her remains were exhumed and transported to Barcelona, later being reinterred in her birthplace, Valderrobres.
Paul Hindemith	1963	Composer	Cimetière de Saint-Légier-La Chiésaz, Blonay – Saint-Légier, Switzerland		
Josef Hofmann	1957	Pianist	Forest Lawn Memorial Park, Glendale, US	External image: Hofmann	
Imogen Holst	1984	Composer	St Peter and St Paul's Church, Aldeburgh, England	External image: Holst	She was the musical assistant to Benjamin Britten and is buried just behind him.
Gustav Holst	1934	Composer	Chichester Cathedral, Chichester, England		His ashes were interred close to the memorial of Thomas Weelkes, his favourite Tudor period composer. In his funeral, Vaughan Williams conducted music by Holst and himself. In 2009, the 75th anniversary of Holst's death, the old memorial was replaced by a new oval-shaped memorial. It bears an inscription from Holst’s The Hymn of Jesus: "The heavenly spheres make music for us".
Vladimir Horowitz	1989	Pianist	Cimitero Monumentale, Milan, Italy		He was buried next to his daughter Sonia (1934–1975) in the Toscanini family tomb in the Cimitero Monumentale. His wife Wanda Toscanini was buried beside them in 1998. In 2004 intruders broke into the family tomb opening her coffin and damaging her tombstone.
Johann Nepomuk Hummel	1837	Composer	Historischer Friedhof Weimar, Weimar, Germany		
Engelbert Humperdinck	1921	Composer	Südwestkirchhof Stahnsdorf, Stahnsdorf, Germany		
John Ireland	1962	Composer	St Mary's Church, Shipley, England		
Charles Ives	1954	Composer	Wooster Cemetery, Danbury, US	External image: Ives	
Leoš Janáček	1928	Composer	Brno Central Cemetery, Brno, Czech Republic		The tombstone is inscribed with verses from his choral piece "The Wandering Madman".
Joseph Joachim	1907	Violinist, conductor, composer	Kaiser Wilhelm Memorial Cemetery, Berlin, Germany		
Scott Joplin	1917	Composer	St. Michael's Cemetery, New York, US		He was buried in a common grave. A memorial was erected in 1974, the year The Sting, which showcased his music, won Best Picture at the Oscars.
Jane Joseph	1929	Composer	Willesden Jewish Cemetery, London, England	Upload photo	She was buried in plot 1A, row L, section N.
Herbert von Karajan	1989	Conductor	Anif Cemetery, Anif, Austria		
Mieczysław Karłowicz	1909	Composer	Powązki Cemetery, Warsaw, Poland		
Wilhelm Kempff	1991	Pianist	Friedhof Wernstein, Wernstein am Inn, Austria		He died in Positano, Italy.
Albert Ketèlbey	1959	Composer	Golders Green Crematorium, London, England	Upload photo	By the time of his death he had slipped into obscurity and only a handful of mourners attended his funeral. He was cremated at Golders Green Crematorium. A memorial plaque for him was placed on a wall at the crematorium, intended to be displayed for 50 years. It is unclear if any permanent grave marker exists today.
Aram Khachaturian	1978	Composer	Komitas Pantheon, Yerevan, Armenia		
Carlos Kleiber	2004	Conductor	Konjšica Cemetery, Konjšica, Slovenia		
Erich Kleiber	1956	Conductor	Friedhof Hönggerberg, Zürich, Switzerland		
Otto Klemperer	1973	Conductor, composer	Friedhof Oberer Friesenberg, Zürich, Switzerland		
Hans Knappertsbusch	1965	Conductor	Friedhof Bogenhausen, Munich, Germany		
Zoltán Kodály	1967	Composer	Farkasréti Cemetery, Budapest, Hungary		
Joonas Kokkonen	1996	Composer	Järvenpää Cemetery, Järvenpää, Finland	External image: Kokkonen	
Erich Wolfgang Korngold	1957	Composer	Hollywood Forever Cemetery, Los Angeles, US		An excerpt from the duet Glück, das mir verblieb from his opera Die tote Stadt is inscribed on the tomb.
Alfredo Kraus	1999	Opera singer	Cementerio de Las Palmas, Las Palmas de Gran Canaria, Spain	External image: Kraus	He was initially buried in the cemetery of Boadilla del Monte in Madrid, where his wife was buried. In 2009 both of their remains were relocated to their hometown, Las Palmas.
Fritz Kreisler	1962	Violinist, composer	Woodlawn Cemetery, New York, US		
Rafael Kubelík	1996	Conductor	Vyšehrad Cemetery, Prague, Czech Republic		
Friedrich Kuhlau	1832	Composer, pianist	Assistens Cemetery, Copenhagen, Denmark		
Édouard Lalo	1892	Composer	Cimetière du Père-Lachaise, Paris, France		
Constant Lambert	1951	Composer, conductor	Brompton Cemetery, London, England		
Francesco Landini	1397	Composer	Basilica of San Lorenzo, Florence, Italy		His tombstone, lost until the 19th century and now redisplayed in the basilica, features a depiction of him with a portative organ.
Rued Langgaard	1952	Composer	Holmen Cemetery, Copenhagen, Denmark		
Mario Lanza	1959	Opera singer	Holy Cross Cemetery, Culver City, US		
Orlando di Lasso	1594	Composer	Alter Franziskaner Friedhof, Munich, Germany		The cemetery, originally belonging to the now defunct Franziskanerkloster convent, was cleared of gravestones in 1789. It was situated at the location that is now the Max-Joseph-Platz. A plaque commemorating the composer was installed there in c. 1963. His original gravestone (Note: The gravestone was made from red marble tombstone and featured a bas-relief by Jan Sadeler, depicting "The Entombment of Christ," the Lassus family crest, and symbolic images of Lassus with his family. The tombstone also included several epitaphs, in Latin and French, honoring his musical achievements and legacy. After the cemetery's destruction, an admirer preserved the tombstone.) is preserved at the Bavarian National Museum. The Orlando di Lasso statue in Munich, located in Promenadeplatz, has served as an unofficial Michael Jackson memorial since 2009, adorned by fans with tributes.
Giacomo Lauri-Volpi	1979	Opera singer	Cementerio Municipal de Godella, Godella, Spain		
Hipólito Lázaro	1974	Opera singer	Cementiri de Montjuïc, Barcelona, Spain		
Ernesto Lecuona	1963	Composer	Gate of Heaven Cemetery, Mount Pleasant, US		He was interred at Gate of Heaven Cemetery but his will instructed that his remains be repatriated after the Cuban communist regime changes.
Franz Lehár	1948	Composer	Friedhof Bad Ischl, Bad Ischl, Austria		
Ruggero Leoncavallo	1919	Composer	Chiesa di Santa Maria di Ponte, Brissago, Switzerland		He was initially buried in Cimitero delle Porte Sante, Florence. In 1989 his remains and his wife Berthe's were moved, supported by his last descendant, to Brissago where he owned the summer residence Villa Myriam. This decision was influenced by an unverified claim about his preference to be buried there and his casual mention of it in a 1904 speech.
György Ligeti	2006	Composer	Wiener Zentralfriedhof, Vienna, Austria		
Paul Lincke	1946	Composer	Hahnenklee Friedhof, Goslar, Germany		
Dinu Lipatti	1950	Pianist	Cimetière de Chêne-Bourg, Chêne-Bourg, Switzerland		
Franz Liszt	1886	Composer	Stadtfriedhof Bayreuth, Bayreuth, Germany		He died in Bayreuth during the 5th edition of the Bayreuth Festival. Various requests were made to claim his remains, the most powerful ones coming from the Duke Charles Alexander who wanted to transfer his body to Weimar, and from Princess Carolyne who proposed burying him in a Franciscan convent in Budapest. (Note: Hungarian citizens, the Wartburg in Eisenach and Liszt's natal village of Raiding also sought to claim his remains for burial.) His daughter Cosima, the Festival director and wife of the already deceased Wagner, wanted to keep Liszt's body in Bayreuth as it was deemed advantageous for the festival and would also serve Wagner's legacy. As his closest living relative, it was her will that prevailed.
Pietro Locatelli	1764	Composer	English Reformed Church, Amsterdam, Netherlands		He was buried in front of the organ of the English Reformed Church at the Begijnhof, one of the oldest hofjes in Amsterdam. The floor of the church was renovated in 1975 and the grave was lost. In 2024 a small monument was erected there in his honour.
Max Lorenz	1975	Opera singer	Wiener Zentralfriedhof, Vienna, Austria		
Albert Lortzing	1851	Composer, opera singer	Friedhof II Sophienkirche, Berlin, Germany		
Jean-Baptiste Lully	1687	Composer	Basilique Notre-Dame-des-Victoires, Paris, France		Lully died from gangrene, having struck his foot with his long conducting staff during a performance of his Te Deum to celebrate Louis XIV's recovery from surgery.
Witold Lutosławski	1994	Composer	Powązki Cemetery, Warsaw, Poland		
Anatoly Lyadov	1914	Composer	Tikhvin Cemetery, Saint Petersburg, Russia		
Mykola Lysenko	1912	Composer	Baikove Cemetery, Kyiv, Ukraine		
Guillaume de Machaut	1377	Composer	Reims Cathedral, Reims, France		He was buried in the cathedral, in the same tomb as his brother Jean, who was also a canon there. The grave was eventually lost. The epitaph, originally inscribed on a now-lost brass plaque, was transcribed by Charles Drouin Ergnault, a priest from Bezannes, into a manuscript that is preserved in the Reims Bibliothèque Municipale (MS 1941). As of December 2024 there is no memorial commemorating the composer in the cathedral.
Leevi Madetoja	1947	Composer	Hietaniemi Cemetery, Helsinki, Finland	External image: Madetoja	The gravestone, unveiled in 1955, was made by the Finnish sculptor Kalervo Kallio.
Nikita Magaloff	1992	Pianist	Clarens-Montreux Cemetery, Montreux, Switzerland		
Gustav Mahler	1911	Composer	Friedhof Grinzing, Vienna, Austria		As he had requested, he was buried next to his daughter Maria and his tombstone was inscribed only with his name because "Any who come to look for me will know who I was, and the rest do not need to know."
Maria Malibran	1836	Opera singer	Cimetière de Laeken, Brussels, Belgium		
Vicente Martín y Soler	1806	Composer	Smolensky Cemetery, Saint Petersburg, Russia		His grave was lost for many years, being rediscovered in 1984 by Irina Goncharova, who relates her adventure in the article "Почти детективная история" (An almost detective story) published in 1998 in the musicology journal ''Early music quarterly''. The inscription on his tombstone reads: "Martini, Vicent, Spanish Court Conceiller, born in Valencia January 18, 1756. Admired in the principal cities and courts of Europe not only for his talent but also for his beautiful and noble moral qualities."
Pietro Mascagni	1945	Composer	Cimitero della Misericordia, Livorno, Italy		
Jules Massenet	1912	Composer	Cimetière d'Egreville, Egreville, France		
Kurt Masur	2015	Conductor	Leipziger Südfriedhof, Leipzig, Germany		
Emilie Mayer	1883	Composer	Dreifaltigkeitskirchhof I, Berlin, Germany		
Nikolai Medtner	1951	Composer	Hendon Cemetery, London, England	External image: Medtner	
Nellie Melba	1931	Opera singer	Lilydale Lawn Cemetery, Lilydale, Australia	External image: Melba	
Lauritz Melchior	1973	Opera singer	Assistens Cemetery, Copenhagen, Denmark		
Fanny Mendelssohn	1847	Composer	Dreifaltigkeitskirchhof I, Berlin, Germany		
Felix Mendelssohn	1847	Composer	Dreifaltigkeitskirchhof I, Berlin, Germany		A monument was built in 1892 in Leipzig to commemorate his contribution to the city. The original statue was taken down by the Nazis in 1936 because of Mendelssohn's Jewish background and then melted down in 1940 for scrap metal during World War II. In 2008 a replica was unveiled commemorating the composer's 200th anniversary.
Yehudi Menuhin	1999	Violinist	Yehudi Menuhin School, Stoke d'Abernon, England	External image: Menuhin	
Robert Merrill	2004	Opera singer	Kensico Cemetery, Valhalla, US	External image: Merrill	
André Messager	1929	Composer, conductor	Cimetière de Passy, Paris, France		
Olivier Messiaen	1992	Composer	Cemetery of Saint Théoffrey, Saint Théoffrey, France	External image: Messiaen	An extract from the song cycle Harawi - Chant d'amour et de mort is engraved on the tomb. The text reads "Tous les oiseaux des étoiles" (All the birds of the stars).
Giacomo Meyerbeer	1864	Composer	Senerfelderplatz Jewish Cemetery, Berlin, Germany		He died in Paris on May 2, 1864. The next day, Rossini, unaware of the news, arrived at Meyerbeer's apartment to meet him, only to be shocked and faint. He subsequently composed a choral tribute, "Pleure, pleure, muse sublime!"
Arturo Benedetti Michelangeli	1995	Pianist	Cimitero di Pura, Pura, Switzerland		
Lluís Millet	1941	Composer	Cementiri de Montjuïc, Barcelona, Spain		
Anna Moffo	2006	Opera singer	Kensico Cemetery, Valhalla, US		
Frederic Mompou	1987	Composer	Cementiri de Montjuïc, Barcelona, Spain		
Mario Del Monaco	1982	Opera singer	Cimitero Centrale di Pesaro, Pesaro, Italy	External image: Del Monaco	Initually buried in Treviso, his remains were moved to Pesaro in 1983. He was, at his request, buried in his Otello costume.
Claudio Monteverdi	1643	Composer	Basilica di Santa Maria Gloriosa dei Frari, Venice, Italy		
Thomas Morley	1602	Composer	St Botolph Billingsgate, London, England		He was buried in the graveyard of the church, which was destroyed in the Great Fire of London of 1666, and not rebuilt. As of December 2024 there is no memorial commemorating the composer in the area.
Leopold Mozart	1787	Composer	Sebastiansfriedhof, Salzburg, Austria		His son Wolfgang was unable to attend the funeral, the travel time to Salzburg being too long. Leopold was buried in a communal grave in Sebastiansfriedhof. Years later, Johann Evangelist Engl financed the creation of a memorial plaque that was installed next to the grave of Constanze, Wolfgang's widow, also buried in the same cemetery.
Wolfgang Amadeus Mozart	1791	Composer	Sankt Marxer Friedhof, Vienna, Austria		All attempts to locate his original grave have been unsuccessful. In 1859 a gravestone was erected at what was presumed to be the correct spot, and was later moved to the Central Cemetery in 1891, the 100th anniversary of Mozart's death. The current memorial at St. Marx was made in 1950, replacing a simple tombstone made by the cemetery caretaker which is preserved at the Bezirksmuseum Landstraße.
Georg Muffat	1704	Composer	St. Stephen's Cathedral, Passau, Germany		He was buried in the cathedral cloister. His tomb is presumably lost. As of August 2024 there is no memorial commemorating the composer in the cathedral.
Modest Mussorgsky	1881	Composer	Tikhvin Cemetery, Saint Petersburg, Russia		
Ginette Neveu	1949	Violinist	Cimetière du Père-Lachaise, Paris, France		She was on board a flight from Paris to New York when it crashed on a mountain in São Miguel after two failed attempts to make a landing at the Santa Maria Airport in the Azores. All 48 people on board the flight died. Her violin, made by Omobono Stradivari in 1730, was also lost.
Otto Nicolai	1849	Composer	Dorotheenstädtischer Friedhof, Berlin, Germany		
Carl Nielsen	1931	Composer	Vestre Cemetery, Copenhagen, Denmark		His wife, the sculptor Anne Marie Carl-Nielsen, was commissioned to sculpt a monument to him. Facing disputes and funding issues, she subsidized the project herself and it was unveiled in 1939. The Carl Nielsen Monument depicts Pan, the god of music, on a wingless Pegasus.
Birgit Nilsson	2005	Opera singer	Västra Karups Cemetery, Västra Karup, Sweden		
Luigi Nono	1990	Composer	Cimitero di San Michele, Venice, Italy		
Turlough O'Carolan	1738	Composer	Kilronan Cemetery, Keadue, Ireland		In 1874 a memorial was erected in St Patrick's Cathedral, a gift from the Irish novelist Sydney, Lady Morgan.
Jacques Offenbach	1880	Composer	Cimetière de Montmartre, Paris, France		
Carl Orff	1982	Composer	Klosterkirche Andechs, Andechs, Germany		His tombstone bears the Latin inscription Summus Finis (The Ultimate End), taken from the end of his last work, De temporum fine comoedia.
Johann Pachelbel	1706	Composer	Rochusfriedhof Nürnberg-Gostenhof, Nuremberg, Germany		
Ignacy Jan Paderewski	1941	Pianist, composer	St. John's Archcathedral, Warsaw, Poland		Paderewski's remains initially rested in the vault of the USS Maine Mast Memorial at Arlington National Cemetery, pending their return to a free and independent Poland. In 1992 they were transferred to Warsaw and interred in the crypt of St. John's Archcathedral. His heart remains at the National Shrine of Our Lady of Czestochowa in Doylestown, Pennsylvania.
Niccolò Paganini	1840	Violinist, composer	Cimitero della Villetta, Parma, Italy		Since Paganini had refused the final sacrament, the church refused his body to be buried properly. His remains were kept in a basement in Nice for five years until his family petitioned to have them buried. He was finally buried in Parma in 1876. Later in 1896, after a viewing request by violinist František Ondříček, he was reinterred in a new tomb where he rests today.
Giovanni Paisiello	1816	Composer	Santa Maria Donnalbina, Naples, Italy		He is buried in a marble tomb sculpted in 1817 by Angelo Viva.
Giovanni Pierluigi da Palestrina	1594	Composer	Saint Peter's Basilica, Vatican City		The inscription on his coffin read Ioannes Petrus Aloysius Praenestinus Musicae Princeps. His tomb was later covered by new construction made under Paul V. The original site is currently situated beneath the Chapel of the Presentation, at a depth corresponding to the Vatican Grottoes. Further attempts to locate his grave have been unsuccessful. As of August 2024 there is no memorial commemorating the composer in the Basilica. A monument by the sculptor Arnaldo Zocchi was erected in 1921 in Palestrina commemorating him.
Osbert Parsley	1585	Composer	Norwich Cathedral, Norwich, England		The plaque to Parsley, which once had indecipherable text, was restored in 1930 as a memorial to the composer and organist Arthur Mann. Mann had been organist at King's College, Cambridge for over 50 years and also a boy chorister at Norwich Cathedral.
Adelina Patti	1919	Opera singer	Cimetière du Père-Lachaise, Paris, France		
Luciano Pavarotti	2007	Opera singer	Cimitero di Montale Rangone, Castelnuovo Rangone, Italy		
Robert Lucas Pearsall	1856	Composer	Kapelle Wilen Wartegg, Rorschacherberg, Switzerland	Upload photo	He was initially buried in a private chapel at Schloss Wartensee, Switzerland. After several relocations due to changes in the castle's ownership and use, in 1957 his remains were reinterred at the nearby Kapelle Wilen Wartegg, which has since been renovated several times. His original tombstone, after being stored in a shed near the castle for over fifty years, was brought in 2012 to St Mary's Church in Bitton. (Note: The Bristol Chamber Choir, an evolution of the Bristol Choral Society, strongly related in its origins to Pearsall, promoted the transfer of the tomb to St Mary's Church, where the composer had worshipped and collaborated.)
Felip Pedrell	1922	Composer	Cementiri de Sant Gervasi, Barcelona, Spain		In 1990 his remains were moved to a common grave for lack of payment. Later attempts were made to locate them but they could no longer be differentiated. As of August 2024 there is no memorial commemorating the composer in the cemetery.
Giovanni Battista Pergolesi	1736	Composer	Chiesa dei Santi Francesco e Antonio, Pozzuoli, Italy	External image: Pergolesi	Since his gravesite could not be located, a cenotaph for him was dedicated at Pozzuoli Cathedral in 1913. The building was largely destroyed by fire in 1964. On the 250th anniversary of Pergolesi's death in 1986, his cenotaph was restored and moved to the Chiesa di Sant'Antonio.
Jacopo Peri	1633	Composer	Santa Maria Novella, Florence, Italy		
Lorenzo Perosi	1956	Composer	Duomo di Tortona, Tortona, Italy		Originally interred inside the Cimitero del Verano of Rome, his remains (along with those of his brother Cardinal Carlo) were exhumed and transferred to the cathedral of Tortona in 1959.
Aureliano Pertile	1952	Opera singer	Cimitero Maggiore di Padova, Padua, Italy		
Allan Pettersson	1980	Composer	Högalid Church, Stockholm, Sweden	External image: Pettersson	He is buried in the church columbarium.
Hans Pfitzner	1949	Composer	Wiener Zentralfriedhof, Vienna, Austria		
Amilcare Ponchielli	1886	Composer	Cimitero Monumentale, Milan, Italy		After his death, the main theater in Cremona was renamed Teatro Ponchielli and his native town was renamed Paderno Ponchielli.
Rosa Ponselle	1981	Opera singer	Druid Ridge Cemetery, Pikesville, US	External image: Ponselle	
Francis Poulenc	1963	Composer	Cimetière du Père-Lachaise, Paris, France		
Michael Praetorius	1621	Composer	Marienkirche, Wolfenbüttel, Germany	External image: Praetorius	He was buried in a vault beneath the organ of the church.
Hermann Prey	1998	Opera singer	Friedhof Krailling, Krailling, Germany		
Josquin des Prez	1521	Composer	Notre-Dame de Condé, Condé-sur-l'Escaut, France		He was buried in front of the church's high altar. The church was destroyed in 1793 along with his tombstone. As of August 2024 there is no memorial commemorating the composer in the area.
Sergei Prokofiev	1953	Composer	Novodevichye Cemetery, Moscow, Russia		He died on March 5, 1953, the same day as Stalin. His funeral faced challenges due to the mourning for Stalin, with about 30 attendees, including Shostakovich. His second wife, Mira Mendelson, died in 1968 and is buried beside him.
Giacomo Puccini	1924	Composer	Villa Puccini, Torre del Lago, Italy		He was temporarily buried in Milan, in Toscanini's family tomb. In 1926 his son arranged for the transfer of his father's remains to a specially created chapel inside the Puccini villa at Torre del Lago.
Henry Purcell	1695	Composer	Westminster Abbey, London, England	External image: Purcell	
Sergei Rachmaninoff	1943	Composer	Kensico Cemetery, Valhalla, US		Some Russian figures are demanding the return of his remains to Russia claiming it was his desire. His descendants, in particular his great-great-granddaughter Susan Rachmaninoff Volkonskaya Wanamaker, oppose it arguing that it would violate his privacy and dignity.
Jean-Philippe Rameau	1764	Composer	Église Saint-Eustache, Paris, France		He was buried in the church of St. Eustache on the same day of his death, although the exact burial site is unknown to this day. In 1883 a commemorative plaque and a bust were placed on the occasion of the bicentenary of his birth. They are located in the third chapel on the right-hand side, dedicated to Saint Cecilia, patron saint of musicians.
Einojuhani Rautavaara	2016	Composer	Hietaniemi Cemetery, Helsinki, Finland		
Maurice Ravel	1937	Composer	Cimetière de Levallois-Perret, Levallois-Perret, France		
Max Reger	1916	Composer	Waldfriedhof München, Munich, Germany		Six years after Reger's death, his funeral urn was transferred from his home in Jena to a cemetery in Weimar. In 1930, on the wishes of Reger's widow Elsa, his remains were moved to a grave of honour in Munich Waldfriedhof. Organ pipes are engraved on his gravestone.
Ottorino Respighi	1936	Composer	Cimitero della Certosa di Bologna, Bologna, Italy		He was initially buried at Santa Maria del Popolo until the spring of 1937, when his remains were re-interred at the cemetery of La Certosa.
Josef Rheinberger	1901	Composer, organist	Vaduz Cathedral, Vaduz, Liechtenstein		He was originally interred in Munich's Alter Südfriedhof, but was moved to his birthplace Vaduz in 1949. His old grave, which was damaged during World War II, remains in Munich as a memorial.
Karl Richter	1981	Conductor, organist	Friedhof Enzenbühl, Zürich, Switzerland		
Sviatoslav Richter	1997	Pianist	Novodevichye Cemetery, Moscow, Russia		
Nikolai Rimsky-Korsakov	1908	Composer	Tikhvin Cemetery, Saint Petersburg, Russia		
Joaquín Rodrigo	1999	Composer	Cementerio de Aranjuez, Aranjuez, Spain		The pantheon is decorated with a cubist guitar made by the sculptor Pablo Serrano.
Juventino Rosas	1894	Composer	Panteón de Dolores, Mexico City, Mexico		As a result of spinal myelitis, he died in Cuba at the age of 26. Fifteen years later, in 1909, his remains were brought back to Mexico.
Gioachino Rossini	1868	Composer	Basilica di Santa Croce, Florence, Italy		In 1887 Rossini's remains were relocated to the Santa Croce Basilica in Florence, but the crypt that once housed them still stands in Perè Lachaise.
Mstislav Rostropovich	2007	Cellist, conductor	Novodevichye Cemetery, Moscow, Russia		Initially his gravesite featured a simple wooden Orthodox cross, but it was improved and changed over time. His wife, the soprano Galina Vishnevskaya, died in 2012 and was buried beside him.
Ludomir Różycki	1953	Composer	Powązki Military Cemetery, Warsaw, Poland		
Giovanni Battista Rubini	1854	Opera singer	Romano Cemetery, Romano di Lombardia, Italy		
Anton Rubinstein	1894	Pianist, composer, conductor	Tikhvin Cemetery, Saint Petersburg, Russia		Originally buried in the Nikolskoe Cemetery, transferred to the Tikhvin in 1939. Monument is not original.
Arthur Rubinstein	1982	Pianist	Rubinstein Memorial, Jerusalem, Israel		His remains were cremated two days after his death. On the first anniversary of his death, an urn holding his ashes was buried, as specified in his will, in a dedicated plot next to Aminadav and the Kennedy Memorial, overlooking the Jerusalem Forest.
Nikolai Rubinstein	1881	Pianist, conductor, composer	Novodevichy Cemetery, Moscow, Russia		Rubinstein was originally buried in the cemetery of the Danilov Monastery. After the monastery's necropolis was abolished during the Soviet period, his remains were among those transferred to Novodevichy Cemetery.
Victor de Sabata	1967	Conductor, composer	Cimitero di Gavarno Vescovado, Scanzorosciate, Italy		
Chevalier de Saint-Georges	1799	Composer, violinist	Cimetière Sainte-Marguerite, Paris, France		Contradicting previous accounts of a solitary death, latest research indicates that Saint-Georges' friends, including noted fencing masters, arranged for his body to be interred at the Temple de la Liberté et de l’Egalité, now known as Sainte-Marguerite Church. The cemetery adjacent to the church was closed in 1806. As of August 2024 there is no memorial commemorating the composer in the church.
Camille Saint-Saëns	1921	Composer	Cimetière du Montparnasse, Paris, France		
Antonio Salieri	1825	Composer	Wiener Zentralfriedhof, Vienna, Austria		
Johann Peter Salomon	1815	Violinist, composer	Westminster Abbey, London, England		He is buried in the same grave as William Shield.
Pablo de Sarasate	1908	Violinist, composer	Cementerio Municipal de San José, Pamplona, Spain		He bequeathed his Stradivari violins, the Sarasate Stradivarius of 1724 and the Boissier of 1713, to the Musée de la Musique and to the Real Conservatorio Superior de Música respectively.
Erik Satie	1925	Composer	Cimetière d'Arcueil, Arcueil, France		
Alessandro Scarlatti	1725	Composer	Santa Maria di Montesanto, Naples, Italy	External image: A. Scarlatti	
Domenico Scarlatti	1757	Composer	Convento de San Norberto, Madrid, Spain		He was buried in the now disappeared convent of San Norberto, which is currently the location of Plaza de los Mostenses. His grave disappeared along with the convent in 1810. His house, located in close proximity to the convent, features a plaque commemorating the composer, which was installed in 1991.
Tito Schipa	1965	Opera singer	Cimitero monumentale di Lecce, Lecce, Italy	External image: Schipa	
Franz Schmidt	1939	Composer	Wiener Zentralfriedhof, Vienna, Austria		
Artur Schnabel	1951	Pianist	Schwyz Cemetery, Schwyz, Switzerland		In 2006 the town of Schwyz declared the grave a monument to be cared for in perpetuity. This exempts the site from the practice of removing the remains after a period of a ten to twenty years to free up the grave site.
Alfred Schnittke	1998	Composer	Novodevichye Cemetery, Moscow, Russia		His gravestone shows a fermata over a whole rest, marked fff.
Arnold Schoenberg	1951	Composer	Wiener Zentralfriedhof, Vienna, Austria		His death was seemingly influenced by his superstitions, particularly his triskaidekaphobia. This fear intensified as he approached multiples of 13, including his 65th birthday in 1939. He altered the title of his opera Moses und Aron, specifically avoiding the two "A"s in Aaron's name, as the original title contained 13 letters. He regularly consulted astrologers for reassurance, and he received a note in 1950 pointing out that the sum of the digits of his age (76) equaled 13, which deeply disturbed him. He died in Los Angeles on Friday, July 13, 1951, just before midnight, after spending the day in bed feeling unwell and anxious. His ashes were interred in Vienna in 1974.
Franz Schreker	1934	Composer, conductor	Waldfriedhof Dahlem, Berlin, Germany		
Franz Schubert	1828	Composer	Wiener Zentralfriedhof, Vienna, Austria		In 1888 Schubert's body was moved together with Beethoven's from Währinger Friedhof to Zentralfriedhof. The former gravestones remained in Währing (which turned into Schubertpark in 1925) and a copy was made for the Zentralfriedhof.
Clara Schumann	1896	Composer	Alter Friedhof, Bonn, Germany		According to her wishes she was buried next to her husband, Robert Schumann, who had died 40 years earlier.
Robert Schumann	1856	Composer	Alter Friedhof, Bonn, Germany		The marble monument was made in 1880 by Adolf von Donndorf, replacing a simpler grave.
Heinrich Schütz	1672	Composer	Frauenkirche, Dresden, Germany		He was buried in the old Dresden Frauenkirche, but his tomb was destroyed in 1727 when the church was torn down and replaced by a new, larger church. The church was completely destroyed in the Dresden bombings of World War II. Reconstruction of the current church began in 1994, where a plaque on the floor of the main hall commemorates the composer.
Elisabeth Schwarzkopf	2006	Opera singer	Friedhof Zumikon, Zumikon, Switzerland		
Alexander Scriabin	1915	Composer	Novodevichye Cemetery, Moscow, Russia		
Tullio Serafin	1968	Conductor	Cimitero Comunale di Cavarzere, Cavarzere, Italy	External image: Serafin	
William Shield	1829	Composer, violinist	Westminster Abbey, London, England		He is buried in the same grave as Johann Peter Salomon. Shield's friend John 'Mad Jack' Fuller commissioned Peter Rouw to create a memorial tablet for Shield. It was intended for Westminster Abbey but was finally installed at St Thomas à Becket Church in Brightling, after objections from the Abbey's dean over the use of the word "gentleman" in its inscription. In 1891 a cenotaph was erected in the churchyard of St. Mary's in Whickham, near Shield's native Swalwell.
Dmitri Shostakovich	1975	Composer	Novodevichye Cemetery, Moscow, Russia		On his grave there is the note motif D, E-flat, C, B natural, or in German musical notation D, Es, C, H; thus standing for his initials in German transliteration (D. Sch). This musical cryptogram was used by him and by other composers several times.
Jean Sibelius	1957	Composer	Jean Sibelius' home, Järvenpää, Finland		His home is now a museum named Ainola after his wife Aino (literal English translation: "Aino's Place").
Beverly Sills	2007	Opera singer	Kensico Cemetery, Valhalla, US		
Bedřich Smetana	1884	Composer	Vyšehrad Cemetery, Prague, Czech Republic		
Antonio Soler	1783	Composer	Monasterio del Escorial, San Lorenzo de El Escorial, Spain		He spent his last years serving Infante Gabriel of Spain and tirelessly composing for him. He asked to be transferred to another monastery, which was not granted. As of August 2024 there is no memorial commemorating the composer in the monastery.
Georg Solti	1997	Conductor	Farkasréti Cemetery, Budapest, Hungary		
Fernando Sor	1839	Composer	Cimetière de Montmartre, Paris, France		
Leo Spies	1965	Composer, conductor	Dorotheenstädtischer Friedhof, Berlin, Germany		
Kaikhosru Shapurji Sorabji	1988	Composer	God's Acre Cemetery, Corfe Castle, England		
Vladimir Sofronitsky	1961	Pianist	Novodevichye Cemetery, Moscow, Russia	External image: Sofronitsky	
Pablo Sorozábal	1988	Composer	Cementerio de la Almudena, Madrid, Spain		
John Philip Sousa	1932	Composer	Congressional Cemetery, Washington D.C., US		
Louis Spohr	1859	Composer	Hauptfriedhof Kassel, Kassel, Germany		
Gaspare Spontini	1851	Composer	Chiesa di San Giovanni Battista, Maiolati Spontini, Italy		
Charles Villiers Stanford	1924	Composer	Westminster Abbey, London, England	External image: Stanford	At the funeral, Adrian Boult conducted the Royal College of Music orchestra, performing Stanford's compositions including "Stabat Mater" prelude and his Symphony in D.
Eleanor Steber	1990	Opera singer	Greenwood Cemetery, Wheeling, US	External image: Steber	
Giuseppe Di Stefano	2008	Opera singer	Cimitero di Santa Maria Hoè, Santa Maria Hoè, Italy	External image: Di Stefano	He sustained severe injuries, leading to a coma, during a robbery at his residence in Diani Beach, Kenya, on December 3, 2004. Despite multiple surgeries and a transfer to Italy, though emerging from the coma, he never fully recovered finally dying in 2008.
Wilhelm Stenhammar	1927	Composer	Mariebergs Cemetery, Gothenburg, Sweden		
Isaac Stern	2001	Violinist	Morningside Cemetery, Gaylordsville, US	External image: Stern	
Karlheinz Stockhausen	2007	Composer	Friedhof Kürten, Kürten, Germany		
Leopold Stokowski	1977	Conductor	East Finchley Cemetery, London, England		
Alessandro Stradella	1682	Composer	Santa Maria delle Vigne, Genoa, Italy		On February 25, 1682, he was fatally stabbed by hired assassins during his stay in Genoa. His tomb is presumably lost. As of August 2024 there is no memorial commemorating the composer in the church. Stradella's fate caught the imagination of romantic composers and inspired four operas, including Flotow's "Alessandro Stradella".
Johann Strauss I	1849	Composer	Wiener Zentralfriedhof, Vienna, Austria		He was buried at the old Döblinger cemetery beside his friend Joseph Lanner. In 1904, both of their remains were transferred to the Zentralfriedhof. The old cemetery transformed to Strauss-Lanner Park in 1928, where both of their old graves remain.
Johann Strauss II	1899	Composer	Wiener Zentralfriedhof, Vienna, Austria		
Josef Strauss	1870	Composer	Wiener Zentralfriedhof, Vienna, Austria		He was buried in his mother's grave in the St. Marx Cemetery, where the old tomb still stands. On 1909 the remains of both were reburied in an honorary grave in the Vienna Zentralfriedhof.
Richard Strauss	1949	Composer	Friedhof Garmisch, Garmisch-Partenkirchen, Germany		On his deathbed, Strauss said to his daughter-in-law: "It's a funny thing, Alice, dying is just the way I composed it in Tod und Verklärung".
Igor Stravinsky	1971	Composer	Cimitero di San Michele, Venice, Italy		
Arthur Sullivan	1900	Composer	Saint Paul's Cathedral, London, England		
Conchita Supervía	1936	Opera singer	Liberal Jewish Cemetery, London, England	External image: Supervía	In 1936, following a pregnancy, she died in a London clinic shortly after her stillborn baby. They were both buried in a grave designed by Edwin Lutyens. The grave, once in disrepair, was restored in 2006 by admirers.
Franz von Suppé	1895	Composer	Wiener Zentralfriedhof, Vienna, Austria		
Joan Sutherland	2010	Opera singer	Clarens-Montreux Cemetery, Montreux, Switzerland		Beside her grave is the future final resting place of her widower, conductor Richard Bonynge.
Jan Pieterszoon Sweelinck	1621	Composer	Oude Kerk, Amsterdam, Netherlands		
George Szell	1970	Conductor	Arlington Memorial Park, Sandy Springs, US	External image: Szell	
Joseph Szigeti	1973	Violinist	Clarens-Montreux Cemetery, Montreux, Switzerland		
Karol Szymanowski	1937	Composer	Skałka, Kraków, Poland		He died in Lausanne but his body was brought back to Poland by his sister and laid to rest at the Pantheon of the Distinguished Poles in Skałka.
Thomas Tallis	1585	Composer	St. Alfege Church, Greenwich, England		His remains may have been discarded by labourers during the 1710s, when the church was rebuilt. A brass memorial plaque, placed there after the death of his wife in 1589, is now lost. His epitaph on that plaque was recorded by the English clergyman John Strype.
Francesco Tamagno	1905	Opera singer	Cimitero monumentale di Torino, Turin, Italy		Initially buried in a family grave, he was later relocated to a 40-meter-tall mausoleum, inaugurated in 1912 and designed by the Milanese architect Raineri Arcaini. In 1986 it was struck by lightning, decapitating a sphinx and creating serious structural problems. The tenor's heirs did not have the means to cover the expenses related to the restoration, so the tomb was handed over to the Municipality of Turin, which completed the works in 1999.
Francisco Tárrega	1909	Composer	Cementeri de Sant Josep, Castellón de la Plana, Spain		
Giuseppe Tartini	1770	Composer	Chiesa di Santa Caterina, Padua, Italy		
Richard Tauber	1948	Opera singer	Brompton Cemetery, London, England		
John Taverner	1545	Composer	St Botolph's Church, Boston, England		He is buried with his wife under the bell tower of the church.
Pyotr Ilyich Tchaikovsky	1893	Composer	Tikhvin Cemetery, Saint Petersburg, Russia		The circumstances of his death have sparked various theories and speculations. While the official cause was reported as cholera, alternative theories include suicide, poisoning, and government intervention. It's also been suggested that his homosexuality and potential scandals may have played a role. The lack of conclusive evidence has perpetuated the mystery surrounding his death.
Renata Tebaldi	2004	Opera singer	Cimitero di Langhirano, Langhirano, Italy	External image: Tebaldi	
Georg Philipp Telemann	1767	Composer	Kloster St. Johannis, Hamburg, Germany		He was buried in the cemetery of the monastery of St. Johannis, where the Rathausmarkt stands today. There, a memorial plaque on the left of the entrance to the town hall commemorates him.
Luisa Tetrazzini	1940	Opera singer	Cimitero Monumentale, Milan, Italy		She was initially interred in a mausoleum in the Cimitero Monumentale, which was later dismantled due to financial constraints. Her remains were temporarily relocated to the Cimitero Maggiore in 1993, before being permanently moved back to the Cimitero Monumentale, specifically to the Civico Mausoleo Palanti, designated for honorable citizens of Milan. It wasn't until 2020 that a plaque bearing Tetrazzini's name was placed on the mausoleum, thereby formally acknowledging her burial site.
Ambroise Thomas	1896	Composer	Cimetière de Montmartre, Paris, France		
Virgil Thomson	1989	Composer	Rehoboth Cemetery, Slater, US	External image: Thomson	
Eduard Toldrà	1962	Composer	Cementiri de Montjuïc, Barcelona, Spain	Upload photo	
Arturo Toscanini	1957	Conductor	Cimitero Monumentale, Milan, Italy		His epitaph is taken from one account of his remarks concluding the 1926 premiere of Puccini's unfinished Turandot: "Qui finisce l'opera, perché a questo punto il maestro è morto" ("Here the opera ends, because at this point the maestro died").
Joaquín Turina	1949	Composer	Cementerio de la Almudena, Madrid, Spain		
Eva Turner	1990	Opera singer	St Wilfrid's Churchyard, Standish, England	External image: Turner	
Artemy Vedel	1808	Composer	Shchekavytsia Cemetery, Kyiv, Ukraine		The cemetery was destroyed when the area was redeveloped in the 1930s and the grave is now lost. As of August 2024 there is no memorial commemorating the composer in the area.
Giuseppe Verdi	1901	Composer	Casa di Riposo per Musicisti, Milan, Italy		Verdi was originally buried next to Strepponi in Milan's Cimitero Monumentale. One month later their remains were moved to the Casa di Riposo per Musicisti, a charitable retirement home for musicians that Verdi had established shortly before his death.
Pauline Viardot	1910	Opera singer	Cimetière de Montmartre, Paris, France		
Tomás Luis de Victoria	1611	Composer	Monasterio de las Descalzas Reales, Madrid, Spain		According to his death certificate preserved in the archives of San Ginés Church he was buried at the Convent of Las Descalzas Reales, although the exact location of his remains is unknown. A memorial plaque was placed there in 1990.
Francesc Viñas	1933	Opera singer	Cementiri de Montjuïc, Barcelona, Spain		His brother asked the sculptor Mariano Benlliure to create a special grave monument for him at Montjuïc Cemetery. In the monument, Benlliure sculpted Viñas as the three famous characters from Wagner's operas for which he was known: Lohengrin, Parsifal, and Tristan.
Ramón Vinay	1996	Opera singer	Cementerio Municipal de Chillán, Chillán, Chile		
Antonio Vivaldi	1741	Composer	Bürgerspital-Gottesacker, Vienna, Austria		Vivaldi was buried in an unmarked grave at Vienna's Spitaller Gottsacker. This cemetery was abandoned in 1783, and the Vienna University of Technology was built on the grounds in 1818. In 1978, on the 300th anniversary of his birth, a plaque was installed there to indicate Vivaldi's long-lost gravesite.
Amadeu Vives	1932	Composer	Cementiri de Collbató, Collbató, Spain		Initially buried in Cementiri de Montjuïc, Barcelona, in 2014 his remains were moved to his hometown Collbató. The original tomb still stands in Montjuïc.
Walther von der Vogelweide	c. 1230	Composer	Neumünster Collegiate Church, Würzburg, Germany		His grave's location and a lost epitaph are known from Michael de Leone's records. Although the grave was likely removed during the 18th-century renovation of church, a memorial stone was erected in 1930 in the adjacent Lusamgärtchen. The stone features a phrase by poet Hugo von Trimberg and bowls for feeding birds, reflecting a legend that Walther requested daily feeding of birds at his grave.
Richard Wagner	1883	Composer	Wahnfried, Bayreuth, Germany		The ashes of his second wife, Cosima Wagner, were buried alongside him in 1977, 47 years after her death.
Émile Waldteufel	1915	Composer	Cimetière du Père-Lachaise, Paris, France		
Ian Wallace	2009	Opera singer	Holy Trinity Church, West Runton, England		
Bruno Walter	1962	Conductor	Cimitero di Sant'Abbondio, Gentilino, Switzerland		
William Walton	1983	Composer	La Mortella, Ischia, Italy		His ashes were interred in the garden of his home, La Mortella.
Peter Warlock	1930	Composer	Nightingale Cemetery, Godalming, England		He was mistakenly buried alongside his father’s first wife rather than with his father. In 2005 his grave was rededicated, following a restoration funded by the Warlock Society and other local groups.
Leonard Warren	1960	Opera singer	Saint Mary's Cemetery, Greenwich, US		He died of a heart attack on stage at the Metropolitan Opera during a performance of "La forza del destino". He collapsed after singing Don Carlo's Act III aria Morir, tremenda cosa! ("To die, tremendous thing!").
Carl Maria von Weber	1826	Composer	Old Catholic Cemetery, Dresden, Germany		Weber died in London and was given a ceremonial burial in the vaults beneath the Catholic Chapel at St Mary Moorfields. Amongst the mourners were many notable musicians, including Anton Furstenau, Ignaz Moscheles and Christian Kramer. His body was transferred to Dresden eighteen years later on the initiative of Richard Wagner, who composed the eulogy "An Weber's Grabe" WWV 72 for the reburial.
Anton Webern	1945	Composer	Mittsersill Kirchhof, Mittsersill, Austria		On 15 September 1945, during the Allied occupation of Austria, Webern was smoking a cigar outside his home about one hour before curfew when he was shot and killed by US Army cook Raymond Norwood Bell.
Willoughby Weiss	1867	Opera singer	Highgate Cemetery, London, England		
Henryk Wieniawski	1880	Violinist, composer	Powązki Cemetery, Warsaw, Poland		
Józef Wieniawski	1912	Pianist, composer	Ixelles Communal Cemetery, Ixelles, Belgium		
Mathilde Wildauer	1878	Opera singer	Friedhof Hietzing, Vienna, Austria		
Ralph Vaughan Williams	1958	Composer	Westminster Abbey, London, England		
Oswald von Wolkenstein	1445	Composer	Neustift Abbey, Vahrn, Italy		He died in Merano, but his body was brought to Neustift Abbey and buried there. His gravestone was likely destroyed during 18th-century renovations. In 1973, skeletal remains were discovered during floor work in the church. From 1977 to 1982, the remains were analyzed at the University of Linz and the University of Bern, concluding with high probability that they belonged to Oswald von Wolkenstein. After years in storage, the remains were returned to Neustift Abbey on 1988, and reburied in 1989. As of December 2024 there is no memorial commemorating the composer in the abbey. In 1408, in preparation for a pilgrimage to the Holy Land, Oswald paid for a memorial stone to be installed on the wall of the Cathedral of Brixen. The stone shows him in the outfit of a crusader, with the long beard associated with pilgrims.
Henry Wood	1944	Conductor	St Sepulchre-without-Newgate, London, England		
Fritz Wunderlich	1966	Opera singer	Waldfriedhof München, Munich, Germany		
Eugène Ysaÿe	1931	Violinist, composer	Ixelles Communal Cemetery, Ixelles, Belgium		
Virginia Zeani	2023	Opera singer	Solovăstru Cemetery, Solovăstru, Romania	External image: Zeani	She died in a Florida nursing home after an extended cardiac respiratory illness. Some weeks later she was buried in her native Solovăstru.
Jan Dismas Zelenka	1745	Composer	Old Catholic Cemetery, Dresden, Germany		Zelenka's original grave in the Old Catholic Cemetery has not been preserved. Since 1996 a cenotaph commemorates him on the cemetery.
Alexander von Zemlinsky	1942	Composer	Wiener Zentralfriedhof, Vienna, Austria		After the Nazi occupation of Austria in 1938 he and his family emigrated to New York, where he died 4 years later in his house in Larchmont. His remains were moved to Vienna in 1985.

== Uncertain burial places ==
This section contains the classical musicians for whom the passage of time and the lack of reliable historical records have left their burial sites undetermined. It also includes musicians whose unique circumstances of death or burial arrangements have left them without a traditional final resting place.

The list can be sorted by clicking on the corresponding arrows in the column titles.

Name	Death	Occupation	Images	Notes
Tomaso Albinoni	1751	Composer		Little information has remained about Albinoni's final years. A record from the parish of San Barnaba indicates he died in Venice in 1751, of diabetes.
John Cage	1992	Composer	—N/a	According to his wishes, his ashes were scattered in the Ramapo Mountains, near Stony Point, New York, at the same place where he had scattered the ashes of his parents.
Antonio Caldara	1736	Composer		He spent his last years as Vize-Kapellmeister to the Imperial Court in Vienna and it is believed that he was buried in St. Stephen's Cathedral, Vienna.
Marc-Antoine Charpentier	1704	Composer		It is believed he was buried in a cemetery just behind the Sainte-Chapelle in Paris, where he had been maître de musique since 1698. The cemetery no longer exists.
Domenico Cimarosa	1801	Composer		Probably buried in San Michele Arcangelo, Venice, Italy. Apparently no attempt was made to relocate his remains when this church was demolished in 1837.
François Couperin	1733	Composer		He was supposedly buried in Cimetière Saint-Joseph in Paris, which closed in 1781 and was destroyed in 1796. It is believed that the remains were relocated to the Paris catacombs.
Gerald Finzi	1956	Composer	—N/a	He died in the Radcliffe Infirmary, Oxford. His ashes were scattered on May Hill near Gloucester in 1973.
Enrique Granados	1916	Composer		On the return voyage from New York his ship, the SS Sussex, was torpedoed by a German submarine in the English Channel. The Sussex broke in two and the front section sank. At least 50 passengers were left unaccounted for, including Granados and his wife Amparo. Their bodies were never recovered.
Jascha Heifetz	1987	Violinist	—N/a	He was cremated and the ashes were scattered from a plane over the ocean.
Alicia de Larrocha	2009	Pianist	—N/a	She was cremated in the Cementiri de Collserola and her ashes were scattered in the Mediterranean sea.
Johannes Ockeghem	1497	Composer		It is believed that he died in Tours and was likely interred at the old Abbey of St. Martin, based on his will in which he bequeathed his substantial estate to that church. Burial records for him do not exist. The building was sacked by the Huguenots during the French Wars of Religion in 1562 and was later mostly demolished in 1797 during the French Revolution. The two towers that remained were classified as Monument historique in 1840.
Manuel Penella	1939	Composer	—N/a	He died in the Mexican city of Cuernavaca, where he had moved to direct the music for the film El capitán aventurero based on his opera Don Gil de Alcalá. He was supposedly buried in Mexico City.
Johann Stamitz	1757	Composer		He is believed to have been buried in the old Katholischen Friedhof in Mannheim, Germany. This burial ground was demolished in the late 1880s, and while several of its notable graves were transferred to the newer main cemetery, Stamitz's was not. An apartment block now stands on the approximate place.
Barbara Strozzi	1677	Composer, opera singer		She is believed to have been buried at the Chiesa degli Eremitani in Padua, Italy. The church was largely damaged by Allied bombing in World War II because it was located next to German headquarters.
Iannis Xenakis	2001	Composer	—N/a	He was cremated in Père Lachaise in Paris without a religious ceremony, in accordance with his last wishes. His ashes were given to his family.

== Geographic distribution ==
This section includes maps highlighting the cities, towns and other locations covered in the list of known burial places.

Burial places in Central Europe
Burial places in Italy and the Vatican City
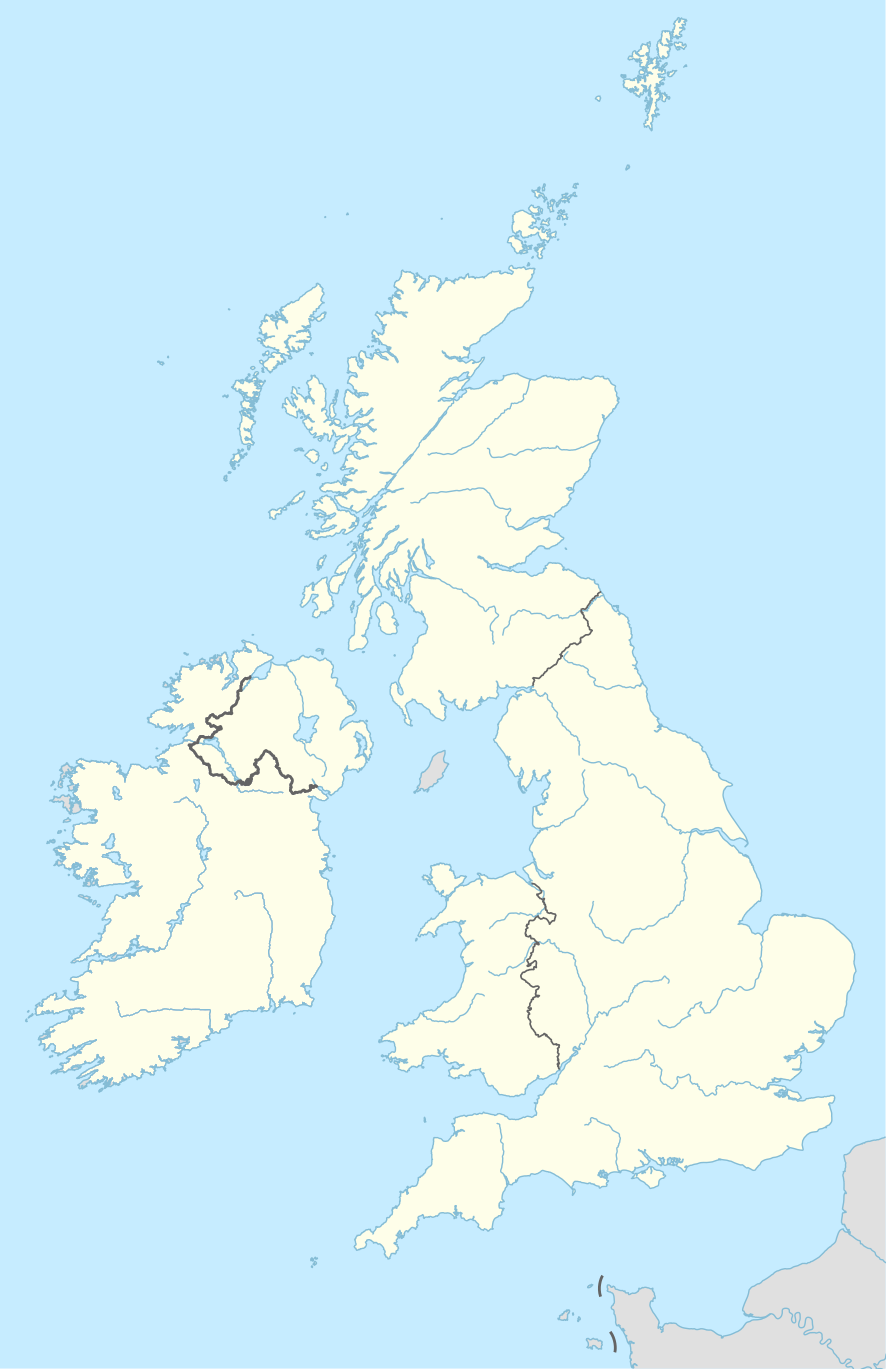
Burial places in Ireland and the United Kingdom
Burial places in France
Burial places in Spain, excluding the Canary Islands
Burial places in Scandinavia
Burial places in US and Canada
Burial places in other parts of the world

== See also ==
- Outline of classical music
- Lists of composers
- Classical music lists
