= St. Marx Cemetery =

Cemetery in Vienna, Austria

Coordinates: 48°10′58″N 16°24′06″E

Sankt Marxer Friedhof
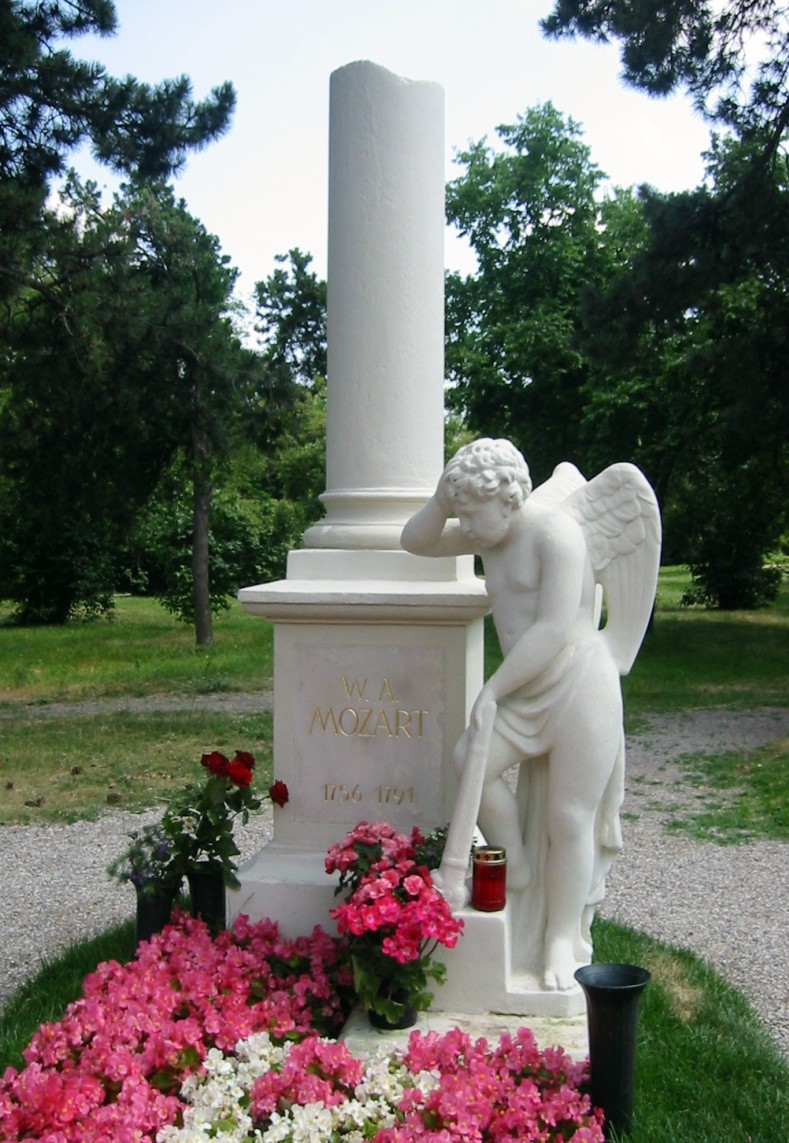
- The memorial of Wolfgang Amadeus Mozart
- Interactive map of Sankt Marxer Friedhof

Details
- Established: 1784
- Location: Landstraße, Vienna
- Country: Austria
- Type: Public (closed)
- Size: ?
- No. of graves: ?

St. Marx Cemetery (Sankt Marxer Friedhof) is a cemetery in the Landstraße district of Vienna, used from 1784 until 1874. It contains the unmarked grave of the composer Wolfgang Amadeus Mozart.

== History ==
The cemetery was named after a nearby almshouse whose chapel had been consecrated to St Mark. It opened in 1784 following a decree by Emperor Joseph II that forbade further burials in cemeteries within the outer walls of the city of Vienna. He also ordered that bodies should be buried in unmarked graves, without coffins or embalming. This regulation however never came into effect in Vienna, because the government of the city denied its approval because the populace did not want to be reminded of the mass graves of plague times. There were no mass graves in late 18th-century Vienna.

Thus the common assumption that Mozart's grave was unmarked because he was too poor is false. His burial in 1791 after a funeral in the Stephansdom simply followed the regulations of the day.

== Notable interments ==
It includes the graves of:

- Ivan Franjo Jukić
- Johann Georg Albrechtsberger
- Elias Parish Alvars
- Josepha Barbara Auernhammer
- Count Philipp von Cobenzl
- Anton Diabelli
- Baron Ernst von Feuchtersleben
- Johann Baptist Gänsbacher
- Anna Gottlieb
- Josef Madersperger
- Louis Montoyer
- Wolfgang Amadeus Mozart
- Franz Pfeiffer
- Josef Strauss
- Franz Xaver Süssmayr (unmarked)
- Alexander Ypsilantis

== Mozart ==
The most famous person to be buried in the St. Marx Cemetery is Wolfgang Amadeus Mozart. Later attempts to locate his grave all failed, including a search by his widow, 17 years after Mozart's death, and by Vincent Novello in 1829. In 1855 a gravestone was erected at what was presumed to be the correct spot. Later the stone was transferred to a group of famous musicians' graves at Zentralfriedhof. At St. Marx Cemetery, a worker replaced the gravestone with a memorial tablet, which was again expanded by several contributors. The memorial known today was refurbished by Viennese sculptor Florian Josephu-Drouot in 1950.

== After closing ==
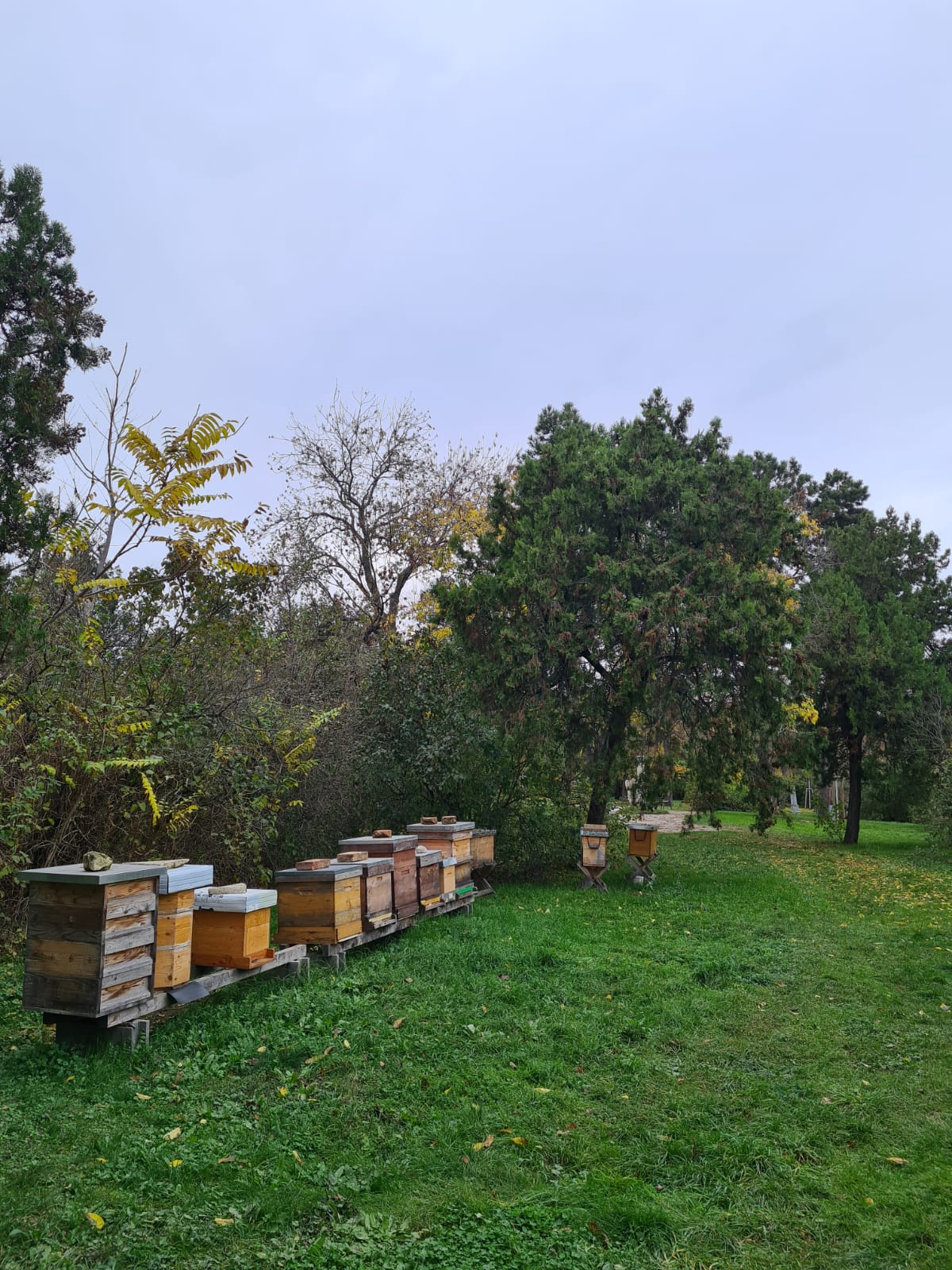
Wooden Beehives near the grave of Wolfgang Amadeus Mozart

Over the years, the rest of the cemetery decayed. In the 20th century it was restored, put under historic preservation status, and opened to the public in 1937.

== See also ==
- List of burial places of classical musicians
