= Josef Madersperger =

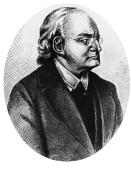
Josef Madersperger

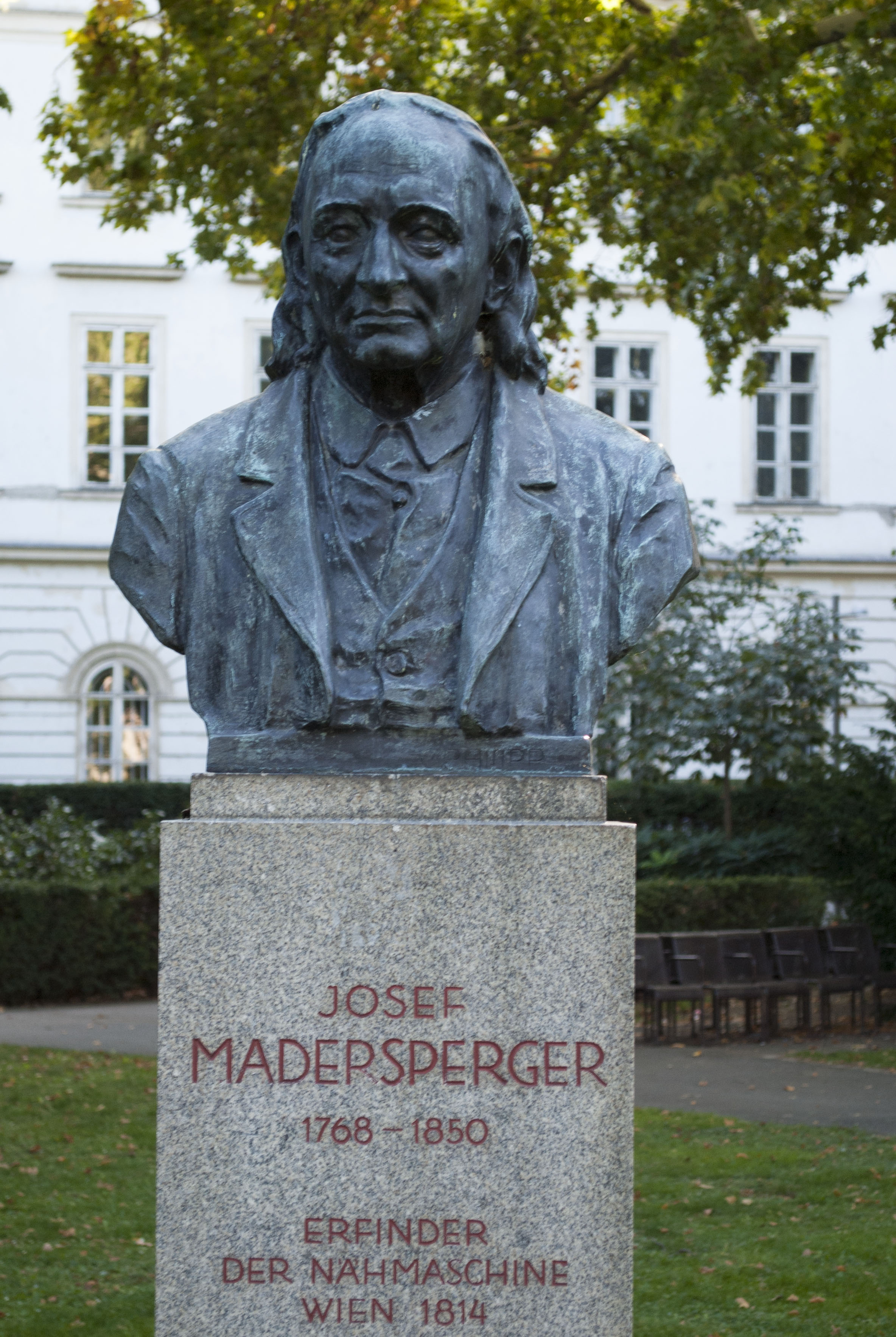
Madersperger memorial in Vienna

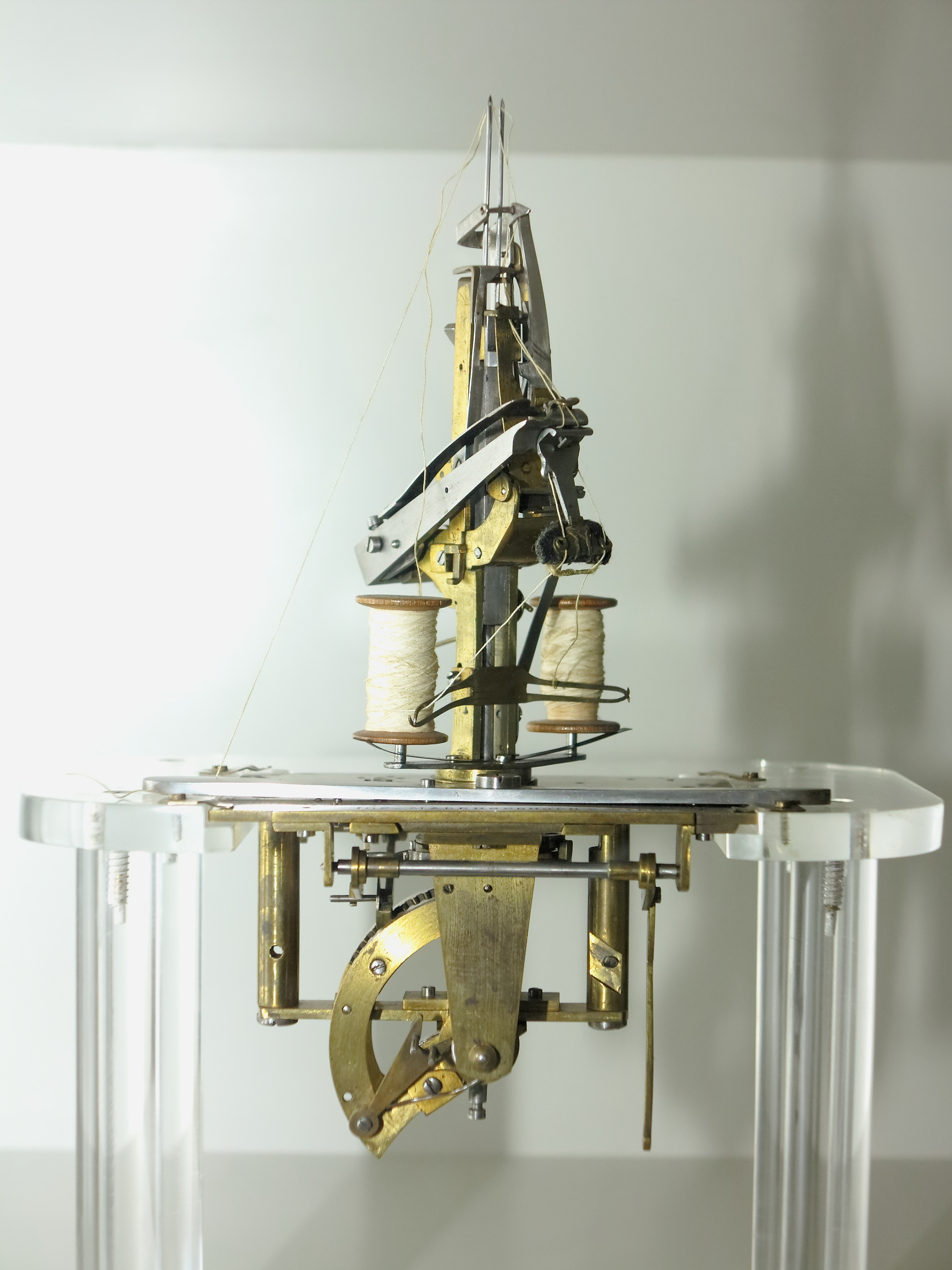
"Sewing Hand" Josef Madersperger 1825, Technisches Museum Wien

Josef Madersperger (October 6, 1768 in Kufstein – October 2, 1850 in Vienna) was a tailor. He is one of the inventors of the sewing machine.

== Biography ==
Madersperger was born in 1768 in Kufstein, western Austria. In 1790, he relocated to Vienna with his father because his parents' house in Tirol burned down. In 1807, he began development of the sewing machine, spending all his savings and leisure time on it. In 1814, he presented his first sewing machine, which imitated a human hand. Madersperger did not commercialize the 1815 granted privilege which expired after three years. By 1823, he was registered as a "former" middle-class tailor.

In 1839, after several unsuccessful attempts to improve the sewing machine, he built a machine that imitated the weaving process using the chain stitch. Madersperger was out of money, so he could not set up a factory. He donated the prototype to the Imperial–royal Polytechnical Institute (the predecessor of the TU Wien). In 1841, he received a bronze medal from the Austrian Trade Association (Österreichischer Gewerbeverein).

Madersperger died on 2 October 1850, spending only three months with his wife in Vienna's almshouse. He is buried in a common grave at the St. Marx Cemetery. Vienna's tailors' guild erected a crucifix made of cast iron, and continues to maintain the grave.

In 1933, a public memorial to Madersperger was placed in the Resselpark at Karlsplatz. Streets in Vienna, Linz and Innsbruck were named after him. The almshouse was replaced around 1955–1957 by a community-subsidized tenement building which the lodgers call Madersperger-Hof. A memorial tablet commemorates Madersperger.
