= Outline of classical music =

Art music of the Western world

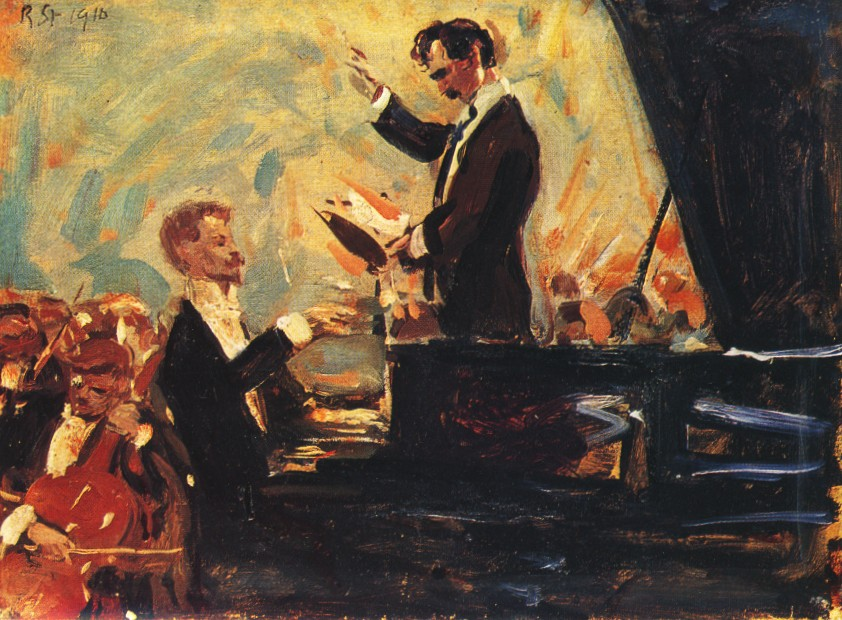
Klavierkonzert mit Alexander Skrjabin unter Leitung von Sergei Kussewitzky by Robert Sterl (1910), Galerie Neue Meister, Dresden.

Classical music – Art music of the Western world, considered to be distinct from Western folk music or popular music traditions.

== History of classical music ==
Musical era (or period) – distinct time frame in the history of music characterized by specific styles, practices, and conventions. Each period reflects the cultural, social, and political contexts of its time. The following is an overview of the stylistic movements within each period.

=== Early music ===
Early music – generally comprises Medieval music (500–1400) and Renaissance music (1400–1600), but can also include Baroque music (1600–1750). Originating in Europe, early music is a broad musical era for the beginning of Western classical music.

- Medieval (c. 500 – c. 1400) – Period characterized by the development of early music notation systems and a strong emphasis on vocal music. Sacred music like Gregorian chant and various other religious and non-religious styles were developed during this time.
  - Ars antiqua (c. 1170 – c. 1310)
  - Ars nova (c. 1310 – c. 1377)
  - Ars subtilior (c. 1380)
- Renaissance (c. 1400 – c. 1600) – Period characterized by the development of polyphony and a richer use of harmony and melody. Genres like the Mass, motet, and madrigal were developed during this time.
  - Transition to Baroque (c. 1600)

=== Common practice period ===
Common practice period – period of about 250 years during which the tonal system was regarded as the only basis for composition. It began when composers' use of the tonal system had clearly superseded earlier systems, and ended when some composers began using significantly modified versions of the tonal system, and began developing other systems as well.

- Baroque (c. 1600 – c. 1750) – Period characterized by the development of tonality and a greater emphasis on contrast and ornamentation in music. Genres like the opera, cantata, oratorio, and concerto were developed during this time.
  - Galant music (c. 1720 – c. 1770)
  - Empfindsamkeit (c. 1730 – c. 1750)
- Classical (c. 1730 – c. 1820) – Period characterized by a shift towards clarity, balance, and structure in music, emphasizing melodic expression and symmetrical forms. Genres like the symphony, sonata, and string quartet were developed during this time.
  - Sturm und Drang (c. 1750 – c. 1800)
  - Transition to Romantic (c. 1800)
- Romantic (c. 1800 – c. 1910) – Period characterized by a focus on emotional expression, individualism, and breaking away from the strict forms of the Classical era featuring more expansive and expressive compositions. Previous genres such as the symphony and opera were enhanced and also new genres such as the art song, nocturne and symphonic poem were developed.
  - Musical nationalism (c. 1800 – c. 1900)
  - Post-romanticism (c. 1900)

=== 20th and 21st century ===
- Modernism (c. 1890 – c. 1975) – Period characterized by a departure from traditional harmonic and formal structures, embracing experimentation and innovation in music. Composers sought new approaches to tonality, rhythm, and sonority.
  - Neoromanticism (from c. 1900)
  - Expressionism (c. 1908 – c. 1950)
  - Impressionism (c. 1900 – c. 1950)
  - Serialism (c. 1920)
  - Neoclassicism (c. 1920)
  - Post-tonality
  - Futurism
- Contemporary classical music (from c. 1950) – Period characterized by a vast diversity of styles and an openness to incorporating elements from various musical traditions and technologies.
  - Experimental music (from c. 1950)
    - Minimalism
      - New Simplicity
      - Holy minimalism
      - Postminimalism
    - Spectral music
    - Spatial music
    - Electronic music
      - Electroacoustic music
    - Aleatoric music
  - Avant-garde music (from c. 1950)
  - Postmodern music
    - Neoconservative postmodernism
  - Punctualism
  - Microtonal music
  - New Complexity
  - Neue Musik

== Composers ==
Composer – person who writes music. This is a list of significant composers organized in chronological order within each period.

- Medieval composers

Notker the Stammerer • Adémar de Chabannes • Adam of Saint Victor • Hildegard of Bingen • Léonin • Pérotin • Philippe de Vitry • Guillaume de Machaut • Johannes Ciconia

- Renaissance composers

Guillaume Du Fay • Gilles Binchois • Johannes Ockeghem • Alexander Agricola • Jacob Obrecht • Josquin des Prez • Antoine Brumel • Nicolas Gombert • John Taverner • Cristóbal de Morales • Thomas Tallis • Giovanni Pierluigi da Palestrina • Francisco Guerrero • Orlando di Lasso • William Byrd • Tomás Luis de Victoria • Giovanni Gabrieli • Carlo Gesualdo • John Dowland • Jacopo Peri • Claudio Monteverdi • Orlando Gibbons

- Baroque composers

Heinrich Schütz • Francesco Cavalli • Giacomo Carissimi • Barbara Strozzi • Jean-Baptiste Lully • Marc-Antoine Charpentier • Dieterich Buxtehude • Johann Pachelbel • Arcangelo Corelli • Henry Purcell • Alessandro Scarlatti • François Couperin • Antonio Caldara • Tomaso Albinoni • Antonio Vivaldi • Jan Dismas Zelenka • Georg Philipp Telemann • Jean-Philippe Rameau • Johann Sebastian Bach • Domenico Scarlatti • George Frideric Handel • Giuseppe Tartini • Giovanni Battista Pergolesi • Domenico Scarlatti

- Classical composers

Christoph Willibald Gluck • Carl Philipp Emanuel Bach • Johann Stamitz • Giovanni Paisiello • Luigi Boccherini • Domenico Cimarosa • Antonio Salieri • Muzio Clementi • Vicente Martín y Soler • Wolfgang Amadeus Mozart • Luigi Cherubini • Ludwig van Beethoven • Johann Nepomuk Hummel

- Romantic and Late-Romantic composers

Ludwig van Beethoven • John Field • Niccolò Paganini • Carl Maria von Weber • Giacomo Meyerbeer • Gioachino Rossini • Franz Schubert • Gaetano Donizetti • Vincenzo Bellini • Mikhail Glinka • Hector Berlioz • Johann Strauss I • Fanny Mendelssohn • Felix Mendelssohn • Frédéric Chopin • Robert Schumann • Franz Liszt • Richard Wagner • Charles-Valentin Alkan • Giuseppe Verdi • Charles Gounod • Jacques Offenbach • Franz von Suppé • Clara Schumann • César Franck • Édouard Lalo • Bedřich Smetana • Anton Bruckner • Johann Strauss II • Johannes Brahms • Amilcare Ponchielli • César Cui • Camille Saint-Saëns • Léo Delibes • Mily Balakirev • Max Bruch • Georges Bizet • Modest Mussorgsky • Pyotr Ilyich Tchaikovsky • Antonín Dvořák • Edvard Grieg • Nikolai Rimsky-Korsakov • Pablo de Sarasate • Gabriel Fauré • Leoš Janáček • Edward Elgar • Giacomo Puccini • Eugène Ysaÿe • Gustav Mahler • Isaac Albéniz • Richard Strauss • Carl Nielsen • Jean Sibelius • Enrique Granados • Amy Beach • Franz Lehár • Alexander Scriabin • Sergei Rachmaninoff • Ottorino Respighi • Nikolai Medtner • Ralph Vaughan Williams • Gustav Holst

- Modernist, 20th and 21st century composers

Claude Debussy • Erik Satie • Arnold Schoenberg • Charles Ives • Maurice Ravel • Manuel de Falla • Béla Bartók • Zoltán Kodály • Igor Stravinsky • Anton Webern • Alban Berg • Heitor Villa-Lobos • Sergei Prokofiev • Paul Hindemith • Carl Orff • George Gershwin • Francis Poulenc • Aaron Copland • William Walton • Aram Khachaturian • Dmitri Shostakovich • Olivier Messiaen • Samuel Barber • John Cage • Michael Tippett • Benjamin Britten • Witold Lutosławski • Henri Dutilleux • Alberto Ginastera • Leonard Bernstein • Iannis Xenakis • György Ligeti • Luigi Nono • Luciano Berio • Pierre Boulez • György Kurtág • Karlheinz Stockhausen • Einojuhani Rautavaara • Henryk Górecki • Alfred Schnittke • Arvo Pärt • Philip Glass • John Corigliano • John Adams

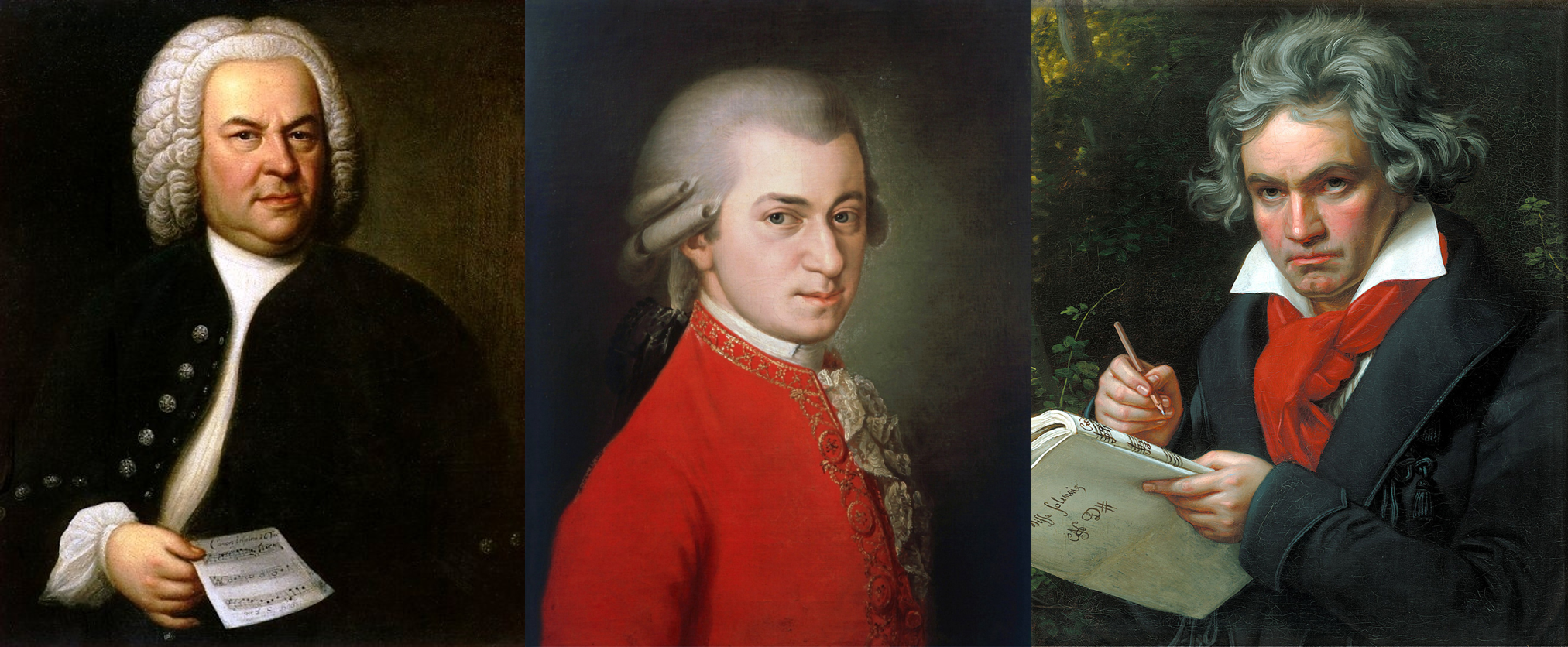
From left to right: Johann Sebastian Bach, Wolfgang Amadeus Mozart, and Ludwig van Beethoven. Their evolving hairstyles mirror the stylistic transitions in their music, from the structured complexity of the Baroque, through the balanced elegance of the Classical, to the emphasis on emotional expression of the Romantic era.

=== Composition schools ===
Composition school – group of composers or a style of composition shared by a group of composers, often from the same area or who studied in the same place. These are some significant schools organized by period.

- Medieval, Renaissance and Baroque schools
  - Saint Martial school – Produced some of the earliest polyphonic music, with Adémar de Chabannes being the best known composer.
  - Notre-Dame School – Developed polyphonic music, with key composers being Léonin and Pérotin.
  - Franco-Flemish School – Developed polyphony in vocal music, prominent composers include Guillaume Dufay, Johannes Ockeghem and Josquin des Prez.
  - Roman School – Focused on the development of Church music, with composers like Giovanni Pierluigi da Palestrina and Tomás Luis de Victoria.
  - Venetian School – Developed the Venetian polychoral style and played a crucial role in the early development of the Baroque style, with composers like Giovanni Gabrieli.
  - Neapolitan School – Crucial to the development of Italian opera, with figures like Alessandro Scarlatti, Giovanni Battista Pergolesi and Domenico Cimarosa.
- Classical and Romantic schools
  - Mannheim School – Known for innovations in orchestral music, influencing the Classical style, with composers like Johann Stamitz.
  - First Viennese School – Developed and refined forms such as the symphony, sonata, string quartet and expanded the harmonic language of the time. The main composers were Joseph Haydn, Wolfgang Amadeus Mozart and Ludwig van Beethoven.
  - The Five – Group of Russian composers that created a distinct Russian national style of music. It was led by Mily Balakirev and included César Cui, Modest Mussorgsky, Nikolai Rimsky-Korsakov and Alexander Borodin.
  - New German School – Emphasized programmatic themes and dramatic expressiveness with composers like Richard Wagner and Franz Liszt.
  - Giovane scuola – Focused on the development of verismo in opera, with composers like Giacomo Puccini, Pietro Mascagni and Ruggero Leoncavallo.
  - Second New England School – Group of American composers based in Boston, Massachusetts, who helped establish a distinctly American tradition of music. Includes composers such as Amy Beach, John Knowles Paine, George Whitefield Chadwick, and Horatio Parker.
- 20th and 21st century schools
  - English Pastoral School – Characterized by its incorporation of Tudor music and English folk elements to evoke the English countryside, creating a distinctively national style of classical music. Notable figures include Ralph Vaughan Williams, Gustav Holst and Gerald Finzi.
  - Second Viennese School – Pioneered atonality and later developed the twelve-tone serial technique, breaking away from traditional tonality. The main figures were Arnold Schoenberg, Alban Berg and Anton Webern.
  - Darmstadt School – Focused on avant-garde techniques, with figures like Pierre Boulez and Karlheinz Stockhausen.

== Classical music composition ==
Musical composition – structured work or piece of music. It can range from simple melodies to complex pieces for various instruments or voices. Classical music has many qualities, or aspects, and compositions may differ in each of them, including their purpose, genre, tonality, key, form, texture, tempo, metre, rhythm, etc., providing rich variety to the art form...

=== Aspects of classical music compositions ===
==== Purpose of music ====
The purpose of music refers to the fundamental reason or intention behind the creation and performance of a musical composition.

- Absolute or Programmatic
  - Absolute – Music not intended to represent or illustrate something else. Self-contained and not explicitly about anything outside the music itself.
  - Programmatic – Music intended to evoke images or convey the impression of events, stories, or natural scenes.
- Religious or Secular
  - Religious – Music composed for religious purposes. If it's composed for use in religious rituals and ceremonies it's liturgical music.
  - Secular – Music composed for non-religious purposes.

==== Genre ====
Classical music genre – category of composition characterized by a distinctive style, form, or content. The range of genres is broad, having grown and evolved over time, reflecting changes in musical tastes, compositional techniques, and cultural contexts. Below are some typical genres of each period.

- Medieval and Renaissance genres

Gregorian chant • Motet • Madrigal • Ricercar

- Baroque genres

Canon • Cantata • Chaconne • Concerto grosso • Fugue • Opera • Oratorio • Suite • Toccata

- Classical, Romantic, 20th and 21st century genres

Ballade • Concerto • Étude • Fantasia • Lied • Mass • March • Nocturne • Opera • Rhapsody • Sonata • String quartet • Symphonic poem • Symphony

==== Tonality and key ====
Tonality and key – together, they define the harmonic and melodic framework of a musical composition.

- Key – specific scale that forms the basis of the tonal structure of a piece of music.
- Tonality (in music) – system of organizing musical compositions around a central pitch or tonic, defining the hierarchy of pitches and chords that gives music its sense of direction and resolution.
  - Major tonality – Music based on a major scale, often characterized by a bright, happy, or triumphant mood.
  - Minor tonality – Music based on a minor scale, often conveying a melancholic, dark or introspective mood.
  - Modal music – Music that employs modes that differ from conventional major and minor scales, prevalent in Western music before the widespread adoption of the major-minor tonality system.
  - Polytonality – Simultaneous use of two or more tonalities or keys.
  - Atonality – Music without a key or tonal focal point.

==== Form ====
Form – structural aspects of a composition, the way its individual sections are constructed, and how these relate to each other. These are some common forms.

- Binary form – musical form in two related sections, both of which are usually repeated (AA′BB′)
- Ternary form – three-part musical form consisting of an opening section (A), a following section (B) and then a repetition of the first section (A), usually schematized as A–B–A.
- Strophic form – song structure in which all verses or stanzas of the text are sung to the same music.
- Rondo form – contains a principal theme (sometimes called the "refrain") which alternates with one or more contrasting themes, generally called "episodes", but also occasionally referred to as "digressions" or "couplets". Some possible patterns include: ABACA, ABACAB, ABACBA, or ABACABA.
- Sonata form – musical structure generally consisting of three main sections: an exposition, a development, and a recapitulation. It has been used widely since the middle of the 18th century (the early Classical period).
- Arch form – sectional structure for a piece of music based on repetition, in reverse order, of all or most musical sections such that the overall form is symmetric, most often around a central movement. The sections need not be repeated verbatim but must at least share thematic material.
- Cyclic form – technique of musical construction, involving multiple sections or movements, in which a theme, melody, or thematic material occurs in more than one movement as a unifying device.

==== Texture ====
Texture – refers to the way different melodic, rhythmic, and harmonic elements are combined in a composition.

- Monophonic – A single melodic line without accompaniment.
- Polyphonic – Multiple independent melody lines played simultaneously.
- Homophonic – A dominant melodic line which stands out above the accompaniment.

==== Tempo ====
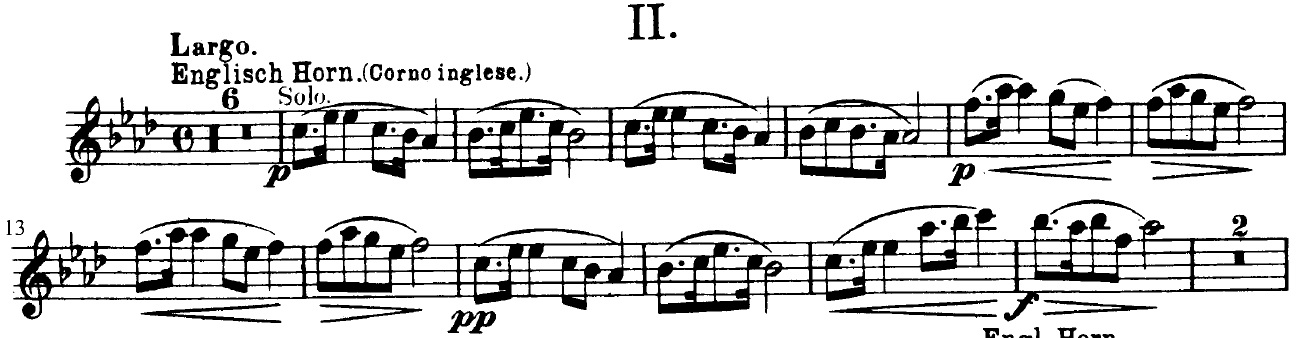
Opening theme of Dvořák's 9th Symphony, 2nd movement (Largo), played by the English horn

Tempo – also known as beats per minute, it's the speed or pace of a given composition. In classical music, tempo is typically indicated with an instruction at the start of a piece, often using conventional Italian, French or German terms.

- Common tempo markings, from slow to fast:

Italian: Largo • Adagio • Lento • Andante • Moderato • Allegro • Vivace • Presto
French: Grave • Lent • Modéré • Vif • Vite • Rapide
German: Langsam • Lebhaft • Mäßig • Rasch • Schnell

==== Metre and rhythm ====
- Metre – recurring pattern of beats providing a structured framework, while rhythm is the arrangement of notes and rests within this framework, creating the distinctive flow and character of a piece.
- Rhythm (in music) – variation of the length and accentuation of a series of sounds. Often reinforced with percussion instrumentation.

==== Other composition related concepts ====
===== Cataloging methods =====
- Opus number – Number assigned to a composition or set of compositions to indicate the chronological order of composition or publication of a composer's pieces. Can be unreliable as some numbers were assigned posthumously and also some composers did not use opus numbers at all.
- Catalogues of classical compositions – Systematic listings of a composer's compositions, often organized in chronological order. Typically created by musicologists or scholars specializing in a particular composer's works. For example, Johann Sebastian Bach's works were catalogued in the Bach-Werke-Verzeichnis (BWV) by Wolfgang Schmieder.

===== Sections and other musical concepts =====
- Movement – Self-contained part of a composition.
- Subject – Musical material, usually a recognizable melody, upon which part or all of a composition is based.
- Exposition – Initial presentation of the thematic material of a musical composition or movement.
- Development – Section following the exposition where the thematic material is elaborated, expanded, and transformed.
- Recapitulation – Section where the initial themes introduced in the exposition return, following the development section.
- Coda – Final section of a piece or movement.
- Cadenza – Ornamental section of a piece played or sung by a soloist or soloists, often allowing virtuosic display.
- Motif – Short musical idea or recurring figure.
  - Leitmotif – Short, recurring musical figure associated with a particular person, place, or idea.

===== Miscellaneous =====
- Musical cryptogram – Sequence of musical symbols which refers to an extra-musical text, usually between note names and letters.
  - BACH motif – Succession of notes 'B flat, A, C, B natural' which in German musical nomenclature form J. S. Bach's name.
  - DSCH motif – Succession of notes 'D, E-flat, C, B natural' which in German musical nomenclature form Dmitri Shostakovich's name.
- Stile antico – Also known as "prima practica", it refers to a composition style from the 16th century.
- Stile moderno – Also known as "seconda pratica", it refers to a composition style from the early Baroque period that contrasts with the traditional stille antico.
- Musica reservata – Style in a cappella vocal music of the latter half of the 16th century.
- Musical repertoire – Collection of music pieces played by an individual musician or ensemble, composed for a particular instrument or group of instruments, voice, or choir, or from a particular period or area.

== Performance of classical music ==
The execution of classical music involves an interpretation of the written score and materializes through the performance of musicians.

=== Musicians ===
Musician – person who composes, conducts, or performs music.

==== Instrumentalists ====
Instrumentalist – musician who specializes in playing one or more musical instruments. Instrumentalists may perform alone or in groups varied by size.

- Soloist – Individual performer who plays a solo instrument.
- Ensemble – Small group of instrumentalists, such as quartets or chamber music ensembles.
- Orchestra – Large group of instrumentalists, typically consisting of string, woodwind, brass, and percussion sections.

==== Vocalists ====
Vocalist (aka, singer) – musician who uses their voice as their primary instrument. They are commonly classified in voice types according to the vocal range.

- Female main voice types

Contralto • Mezzo-soprano • Soprano

- Male main voice types

Bass • Baritone • Tenor • Countertenor

- Choir – Musical ensemble of singers.

==== Other roles ====
- Conductor – Individual who leads ensembles and orchestras, interpreting the music and guiding the musicians during performances.

- Baton – Stick that is used by conductors primarily to enlarge and enhance the manual and bodily movements associated with directing.

- Concertmaster – Leading violinist in an orchestra who plays solo passages and assists the conductor in leading.
- Kapellmeister – Historically, it indicated the music director in cathedrals or for monarchs, with the term evolving to denote leaders of smaller musical groups.
- Page-turner – Person employed to turn sheet music pages for a soloist during a performance.

=== Instruments ===
Musical instrument – device created or adapted to make musical sounds, like a flute, violin, or drum. Instruments can be categorized based on how they produce sound.

- Chordophones – Instruments that produce sound from vibrating strings.
  - Bowed string instruments – Instruments that are played by a bow rubbing the strings.

Double bass • Cello • Viola • Violin

- Plucked string instruments – Instruments that are played by plucking (pulling and releasing) the strings.

Guitar • Harp • Lute • Harpsichord

- Struck string instruments – Instruments that produce sound by striking strings, either with hammers or other mechanisms.

Clavichord • Piano

Modern symphony orchestra layout

- Aerophones – Instruments that produce sound primarily by causing a body of air to vibrate, without the use of strings or membranes and without the vibration of the instrument itself adding considerably to the sound.
  - Woodwind instruments – Instruments that produce sound by splitting the air blown into them on a sharp edge, such as a reed or a fipple. Despite the name, a woodwind may be made of any material, not just wood.

Contrabassoon • Bassoon • Bass clarinet • Clarinet • Cor anglais • Oboe • Transverse flute • Recorder • Piccolo • Saxophone

- Brass instruments – Instruments that produce sound by sympathetic vibration of air in a tubular resonator in sympathy with the vibration of the player's lips.

Tuba • Euphonium • Trombone • French horn • Trumpet • Cornet

- Other aerophones

Organ • Accordion

- Membranophones and idiophones – Instruments that produce sound primarily by way of a vibrating stretched membrane or by the vibration of the instrument itself. Typically part of the percussion section of an orchestra.

Timpani • Snare drum • Bass drum • Tambourine • Cymbal • Triangle • Xylophone • Glockenspiel • Marimba • Vibraphone • Tubular bells • Gong • Celesta • Glass harmonica

- Electrophones – Instruments that produce sound primarily through electrical means.

Theremin • Ondes Martenot • Trautonium • Synthesizer • Sampler

=== Other concepts ===
- Historically informed performance – This approach aims to perform music in a style and manner faithful to the era in which it was composed, often using period instruments and techniques derived from historical research to closely align with the composer's original intent.
- Concert pitch – It's the pitch reference to which a group of musical instruments are tuned for a performance. Concert pitch may vary from ensemble to ensemble, and has varied widely over time.

== Classical music industry ==
=== Buildings ===
- Concert hall – Building with a stage that serves as a performance venue. These are some significant concert halls.

Musikverein • Royal Concertgebouw • Berliner Philharmonie • Carnegie Hall • Royal Albert Hall • Boston Symphony Hall • Suntory Hall • Elbphilharmonie

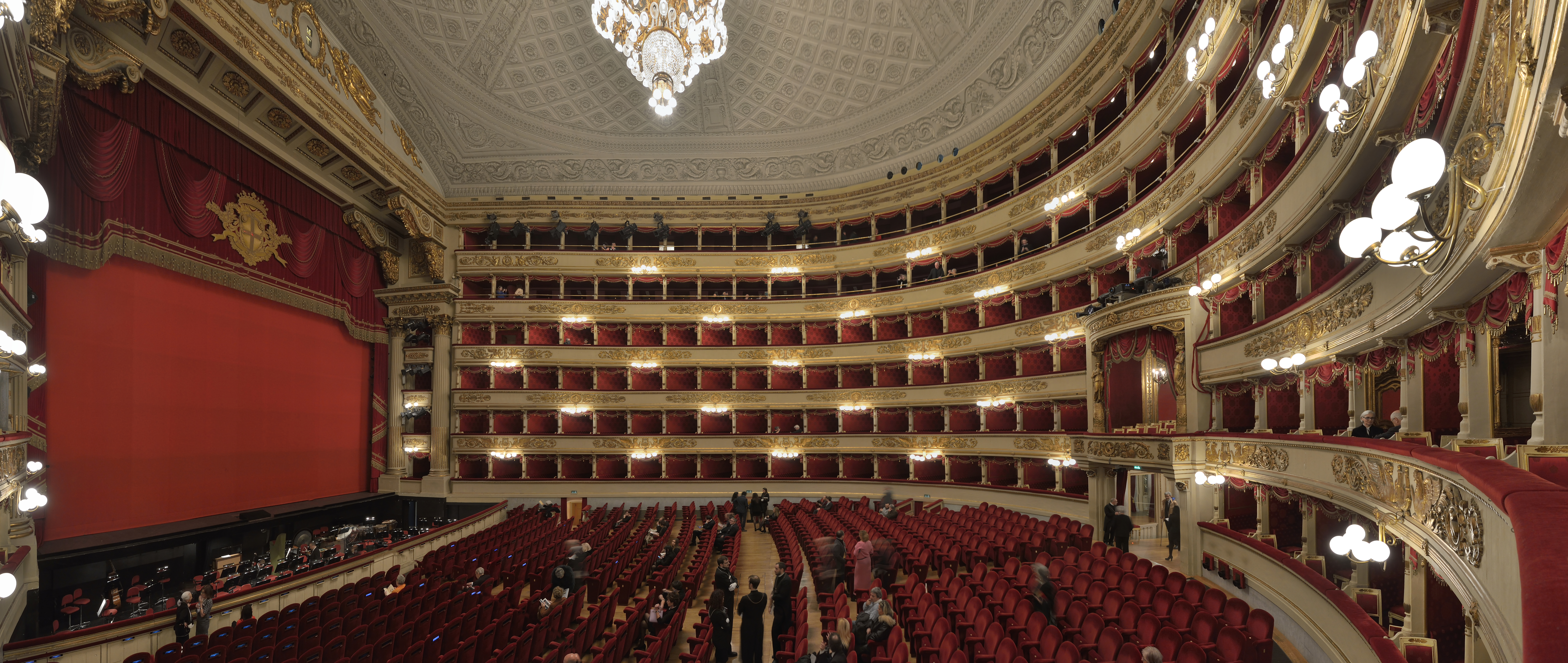
The interior of Teatro alla Scala, Milan

- Opera house – Theatre building used for performances of opera, including a stage and an orchestra pit. These are some significant opera houses.

La Scala • La Fenice • Teatro di San Carlo • Bayreuth Festspielhaus • Staatsoper Berlin • Opéra Bastille • Opéra-Comique • Palais Garnier • La Monnaie • Wiener Staatsoper • Liceu • Royal Opera House • Sydney Opera House • Teatro Colón • Metropolitan Opera House • War Memorial Opera House • Civic Opera House

=== Events ===
- Classical music festival – Music festival focused on classical music. These are some significant festivals.

Salzburg Festival • Bayreuth Festival • Lucerne Festival • Glyndebourne Festival • Verbier Festival • BBC Proms • Aix-en-Provence Festival • Edinburgh International Festival • Bachfest Leipzig

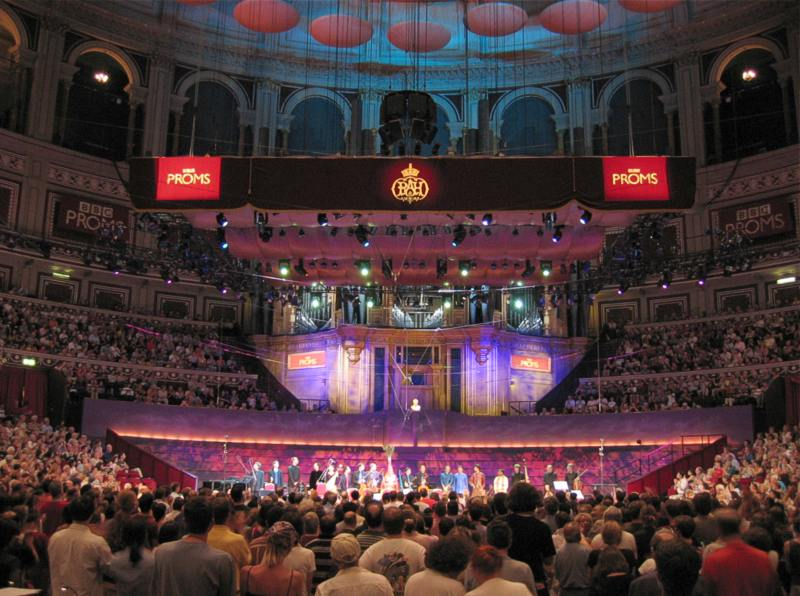
BBC Proms in the Royal Albert Hall, 2004

- Music competition – Public event designed to identify and award outstanding musicians. These are some significant competitions.

Queen Elisabeth Competition • International Tchaikovsky Competition • Van Cliburn International Piano Competition • International Chopin Piano Competition • ARD International Music Competition • Geneva International Music Competition • Paganini Competition

=== Recordings and publications ===
- Classical music record label – Record label that specializes in recording, producing, and distributing classical music. These are some significant record labels.

Deutsche Grammophon • EMI Classics • Sony Classical • Decca • Hyperion Records • Naxos • Harmonia Mundi • Chandos

- Publications and academic journals

=== Awards ===
- Recording awards – Awards that specifically recognize achievements in the recorded format. These are some significant awards.

Diapason d'Or • Echo Klassik • Classic Brit Awards • International Classical Music Awards • Grammy Awards for classical music

- Other awards – Awards that recognize other achievements such as live performances, compositions, lifetime achievements or other contributions. These are some significant awards.

Royal Philharmonic Society Music Awards • Léonie Sonning Music Prize • Ernst von Siemens Music Prize • Praemium Imperiale • Grawemeyer Award for Music Composition • Gilmore Artist Award • Bach Prize • Hindemith Prize • Avery Fisher Prize

=== Education and promotion ===
- Education – Music schools and other institutions specialized in music education. These are some significant institutions.

International Society for Music Education • The Royal Conservatory of Music • Juilliard School • Royal Academy of Music • Conservatoire de Paris • Curtis Institute of Music • Moscow Conservatory • Royal College of Music • Sibelius Academy

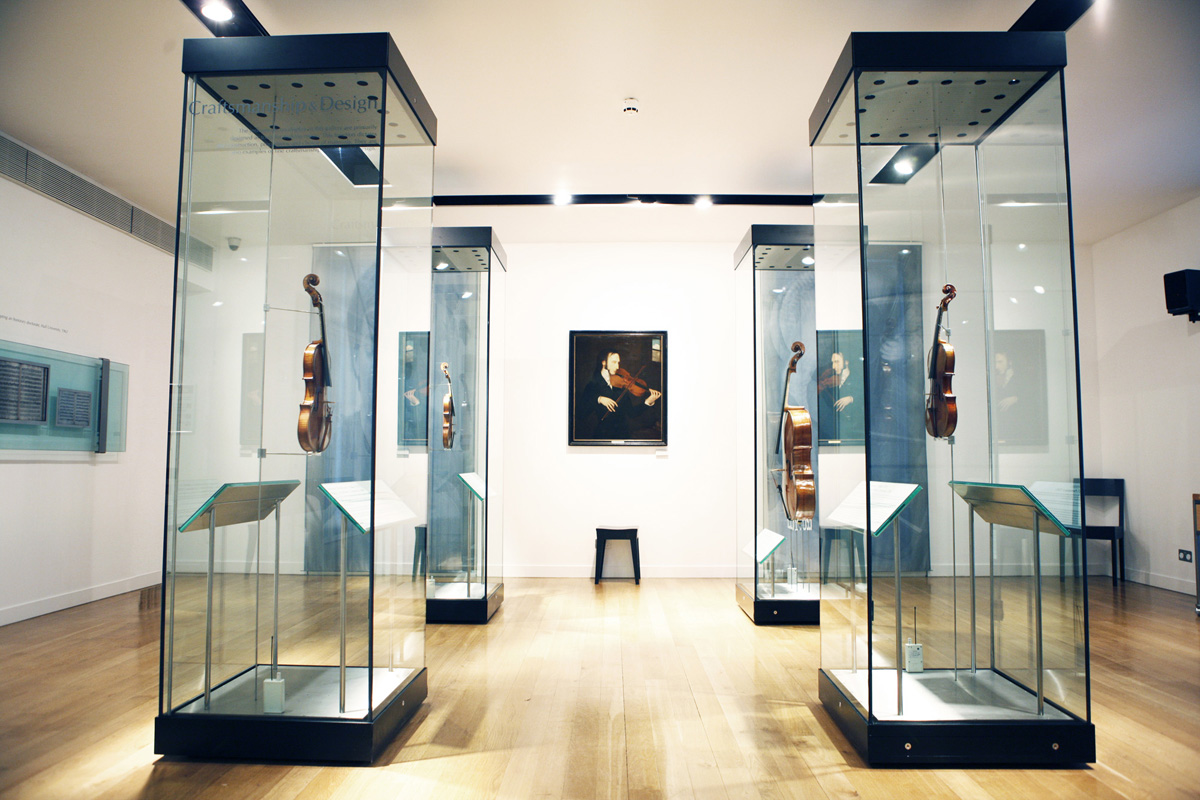
String gallery in the Royal Academy of Music Museum

- Museums – Museums dedicated to the preservation and exhibition of classical music-related history. These are some significant museums.

Royal Academy of Music Museum • Basel Music Museum • Brussels Musical Instrument Museum • Musée de la Musique • Haus der Musik • Mozarthaus Vienna • Arnold Schönberg Center • Antonín Dvořák Museum • Carl Nielsen Museum • Ainola • Berlin Musical Instrument Museum • Beethoven House • Villa Verdi • Villa Puccini • Fryderyk Chopin Museum

- Other organizations

Royal Philharmonic Society • American Composers Forum • League of American Orchestras • Independent Society of Musicians

=== Other media ===
- Films – Films about classical music and musicians. These are some significant films.

Casta Diva (1935) • Fantasia (1940) • Falstaff in Vienna (1940) • Rhapsody in Blue (1945) • Humoresque (1946) • The Chronicle of Anna Magdalena Bach (1968) • The Music Lovers (1971) • Amadeus (1984) • Impromptu (1991) • Tous les Matins du Monde (1991) • Immortal Beloved (1994) • Farinelli (1994) • Hilary and Jackie (1998) • Fantasia 2000 (1999) • The Pianist (2002) • Copying Beethoven (2006) • Coco Chanel & Igor Stravinsky (2009) • A Late Quartet (2012) • The Devil's Violinist (2013) • Tár (2022) • Maestro (2023)

== Other classical music related concepts ==
=== Classical music in society ===
- Women in classical music – Contributions and roles of women in classical music.
- List of women composers by birth date – Chronological catalog of female composers.
- Music criticism – Analysis and evaluation of musical performances and compositions.
- Classical music and politics – Intersection of political themes and classical music.
- Environmentalism in classical music – Intersection of environmental themes and classical music.
- List of classical music concerts with an unruly audience response – Unruly audience reactions at classical concerts.
- Classical crossover music – Fusion of classical music with other genres.
- Baroque pop – Genre that combines rock music with particular elements of classical music.
- List of jazz-influenced classical compositions – Classical works incorporating jazz elements.

=== Musicology ===
- Musicology – Academic study of music, including its history and theory.
- Music therapy – Use of music for therapeutic and health-related purposes.
- Music library – Collection and repository of musical scores, recordings, and literature.

=== Miscellaneous ===
- War of the Romantics – 19th-century debate over musical aesthetics and composition.
- List of burial places of classical musicians – Graves of composers, conductors and other musicians.

== Classical music by region ==
Africa

Egypt • Nigeria • South Africa

Asia

Armenia • Azerbaijan • China • Cyprus • Hong Kong • Israel • Japan • Mongolia • Singapore • South Korea • Sri Lanka • Turkey • Vietnam

Europe

Albania • Austria • Belgium • Bosnia and Herzegovina • Bulgaria • Croatia • Denmark • Finland • France • Germany • Greece • Hungary • Iceland • Ireland • Italy • Kosovo • Latvia • Lithuania • Luxembourg • North Macedonia • Norway • Monaco • Montenegro • Netherlands • Poland • Portugal • Romania • Russia • Serbia • Slovenia • Spain • Sweden • United Kingdom (Birmingham, Scotland) • Ukraine • Vatican City

North America

Canada • Cuba • Guatemala • Mexico • Puerto Rico • United States

Oceania

Australia • New Zealand

South America

Argentina • Brazil (Porto Alegre) • Chile • Paraguay • Trinidad and Tobago • Uruguay • Venezuela

== See also ==
- Outline of music
- Outline of opera
- Classical music lists
- Timeline of musical events
- Classical music by year
- Glossary of music terminology
