= Anna Gottlieb =

Austrian opera singer

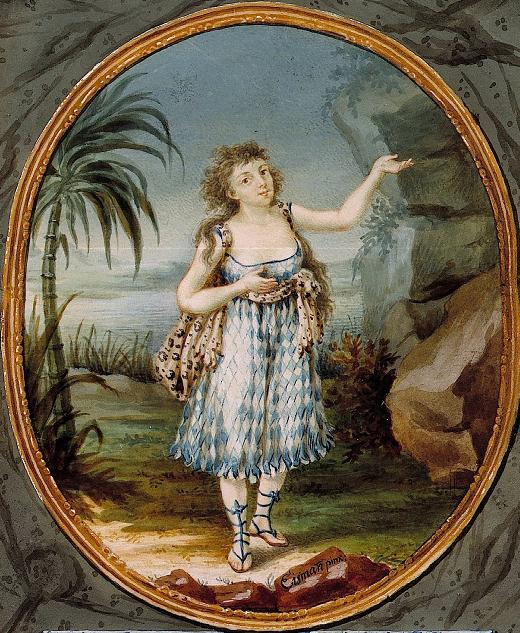
1795 watercolor portrait of Anna Gottlieb by Christian Eisemann. She is shown performing in Azemia oder die Wilden in the Leopoldstadt Theater

Maria Anna Josepha Francisca Gottlieb (29 April 1774 – 4 February 1856) was an Austrian soprano. She was the first Pamina in Mozart's opera The Magic Flute.

She was born in Vienna as one of four sisters. Her parents were actors who worked in the German theatre company of the Nationaltheater, and all four sisters were raised to the family trade, working as actresses as children. Anna first acted at the Burgtheater at age five. Shortly after she turned 12 (1 May 1786), she premiered the role of Barbarina in Mozart's The Marriage of Figaro. At fifteen, she appeared in the role of Amande in Paul Wranitzky's opera Oberon, König der Elfen ("Oberon, King of the Elves"). This production featured in the leading role the soprano Josepha Hofer, who was Mozart's sister-in-law and later premiered the role of the Queen of the Night in Mozart's The Magic Flute.

When in 1789 the actor and impresario Emanuel Schikaneder brought his troupe to be the resident company at the Theater auf der Wieden in Vienna, Gottlieb became a soprano in the company, singing in various Singspiele. When Mozart composed The Magic Flute for the Schikaneder company, he chose Gottlieb, aged seventeen, for the leading role of Pamina, the pinnacle of her career.

In 1792 Gottlieb moved to the Theater in der Leopoldstadt, where, during the years 1803–17 under the direction of Carl Friedrich Hensler, she was "mainstay of the company" (New Grove). She appeared in a number of parody works, and was admired for her ability to lampoon operatic sopranos, having had direct experience in this area herself. Her greatest success at the Leopoldstadt Theater was in the role of Hulda in Ferdinand Kauer's play Das Donauweibchen (1798). Her career was interrupted between 1809 and 1813 owing to the Napoleonic Wars, and when she returned to the stage her voice had declined. As she aged, she gradually changed roles, eventually becoming a character singer playing roles of old women.

In 1828 a new director, Rudolf Steinkeller, took over the Leopoldstadt Theater, and the declining singer was dismissed. She had no pension from her former employer and sank into poverty, appealing in vain from time to time for the Emperor to give her a pension. In 1842 she contacted a newspaper editor, L. V. Frankl, introducing herself as "the first Pamina"; Frankl undertook a fundraising campaign that enabled Gottlieb to visit Salzburg for the unveiling of a monument to Mozart. She was the last singer alive in Vienna who had known Mozart.

The aging Gottlieb was mocked, much later, in the 1896 memoirs of Wilhelm Kuhe:

"[at the 1842 Mozart commemoration] there entered a very tall, thin and eccentric-looking woman who at once exclaimed as though addressing an audience, 'I am the first Pamina' ... she seemed to think that she had at least an equal claim with Mozart to be an object of universal veneration".

Gottlieb, who never married, died in Vienna at 82 and was buried on 6 February 1856 in the same cemetery as Mozart, the St. Marx cemetery in Vienna.
