= Palanti =

Italian surname

Palanti is an Italian surname.

== Diffusion ==
The surname Palanti is present in Tuscany and Lombardy. Near Florence is the highest number of peoples named Palanti. In Lombardy there is a family branch with origin nearby Cremona and extension in Milan, Brescia and Roma.

== Etymology ==
The surname is from the Greek Pallas/Pallade.

== Story ==
The Lombard branch has documented origin since the 18th century from Casalbuttano.

== Biographies ==
- Giuseppe Palanti, painter.
- Mario Palanti, architect.
- Riccardo Palanti, painter.
- Giancarlo Palanti, architect.
- Giuseppe Enzo Palanti, composer.

== Bibliography ==
- Giovanni Triacchini, Genealogie casalbuttanesi, edited for giubileo AVIS, Casalbuttano, 1996

== See also ==
- Palandomus
- Civico Mausoleo Palanti
