= Giuseppe Palanti =

Italian painter

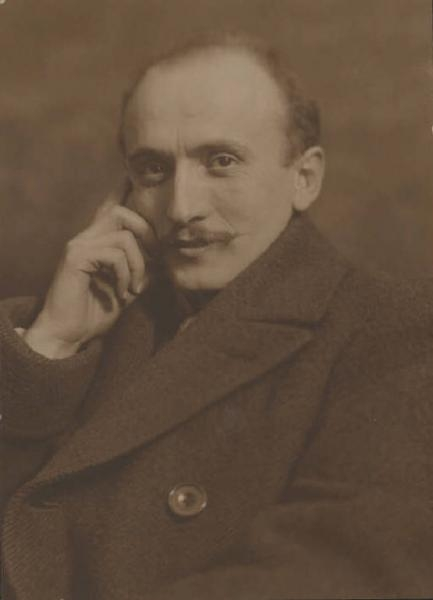
- Palanti in 1912, photograph by Emilio Sommariva
- Born: Giuseppe Palanti; 30 July 1881; Milan, Italy
- Died: 23 April 1946 (aged 64); Milan, Italy
- Known for: Painter, illustrator, costume and advertising design
- Movement: Impresionism, Modernism

Giuseppe Palanti (30 July 1881 – 23 April 1946) was an Italian painter, illustrator, and urban planner, best known for his portraits, notably of Mussolini and Pius XI. He had a long collaboration with Teatro alla Scala in Milan, creating costume, set design and advertising material for multiple opera productions. He was also a major contributor towards the development of the seaside resort Milano Marittima.

== Biography ==
=== Early life ===
Born in Milan to Giovanni Palanti, a carpenter and furniture maker and Virginia De Gaspari, a seamstress, of Cremonese descent, Palanti was orphaned at a young age. Although he completed elementary and technical schools, he is soon forced to find a job, and by 1895 finds employment drawing sketches for the Milanese fabric company, Scotti. At fifteen, he simultaneously enrolled in evening courses at both the Scuola Superiore d'Arte Applicata all'Industria (Higher School of Applied Arts in Industry), where he studied under Luigi Cavenaghi, and the Scuola degli Artefici dell'Accademia di Brera (School of Craftsmen of the Brera Academy). He also sought work as a decorator and poster designer, looking to apply his art practically. In 1898, he enrolled in the painting course at the Brera Academy, taught by Bignami, Mentessi, Pogliaghi and Tallone. In 1899, while still a student, he won a competition to design the cover of the Milanese magazine La Promessa, and posters for the Esposizione Floricola di Monza (Monza Flower Exhibition). In 1900, he won the Zogheb competition for best student of the School of Applied Art. Consequently, was awarded a study trip by the Ministry of Agriculture and Commerce which sent him to Paris to follow the Exposition Universelle, an experience that would influence his style, notably the exhibition pavilions and their advertising billboards. He wrote a detailed account of his interest in poster design, especially the floral work of Alphonse Mucha, and in the technical solutions of art applied to this industry. On graduating in 1901, he was invited by Cavenaghi to teach advanced composition at the School of Applied Art (corso Superiore di composizione) at the Brera Academy, which he would continue to do for ten years.

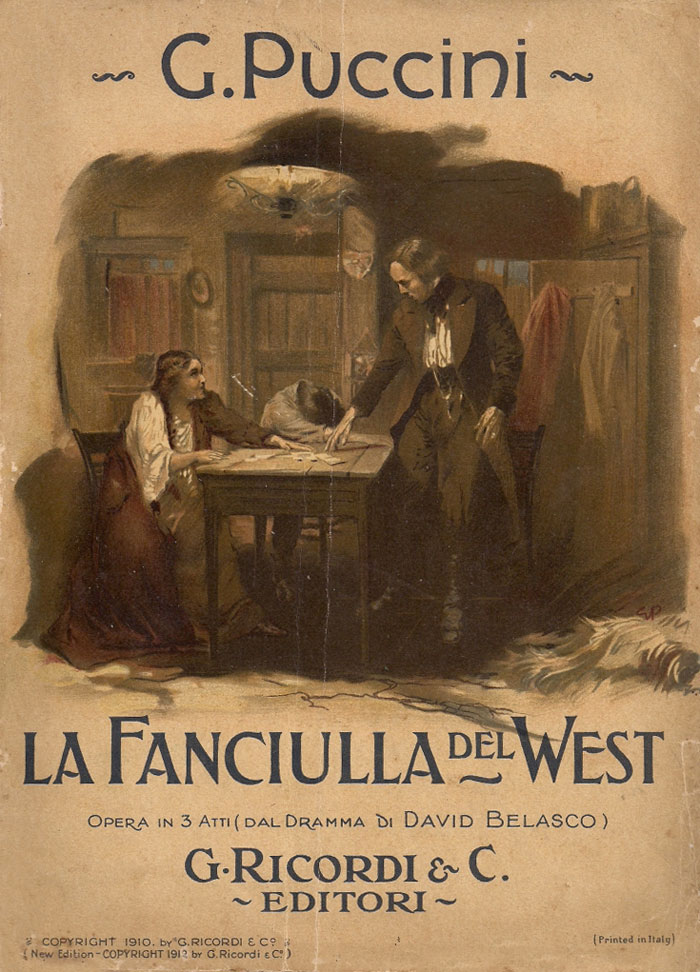
Poster advertising "La Fanciulla del West", 1911

=== Early career ===
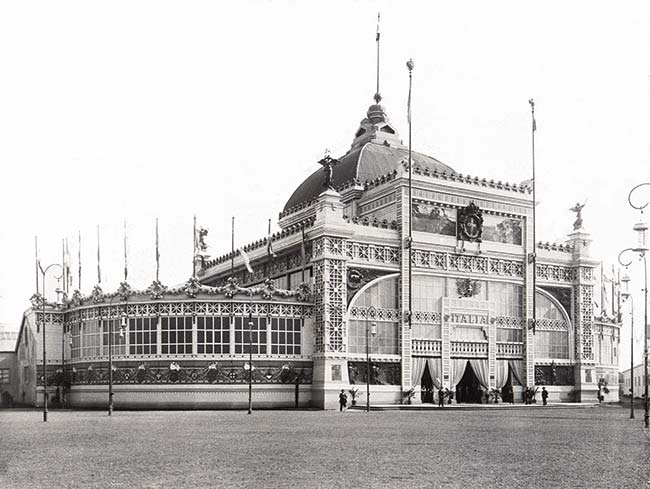
The Italian pavilion at the Exposición Internacional del Centenario in Buenos Aires, Argentina.

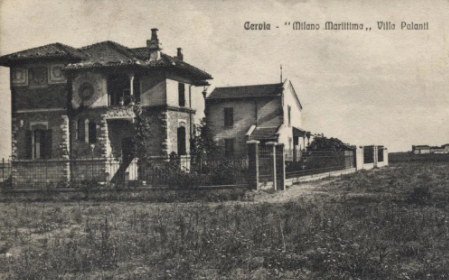
Villa Palanti in Milano Marittima, 1920s

Palanti continued to design and illustrate the covers of sales catalogues for Milanese department stores from 1901 to 1912, working for the Italian Cooperative Union. From 1902, he began working with the Teatro alla Scala as a costume and set designer, as well as designing advertising posters until 1916. His work included among other things design for the first performance of Madame Butterfly by Giacomo Puccini in 1904. He also provided set and costume design for the 1905–06 opera season including The Marriage of Figaro and the La Dama di Picche; Simon Boccanegra in 1910–11, Romeo and Juliet and L'Armida; Don Carlos in 1912; Oberon in 1913; and La Battaglia di Legnano in 1916. He produced notable posters for performances of La fanciulla del West (1911), Isabeau (1912), and Parsifal (1914). In 1907 he became adjunct professor at the Academy's School of Ornament and at the Higher School of Applied Art to Industry (Scuola superiore d'Arte Applicata all'Industria) and from 1913 he replaced Ludovico Pogliaghi in the special decoration school at the Brera Academy. In 1902, he collaborated with the architect Gaetano Moretti to design furniture which was presented in Turin, and later in 1907 his work was used to decorate the Palazzo di Giustizia. In 1906, he was asked to design a series of postcards for the Milan International World Fair. He would go on to participate in both the Centennial International Exposition in Buenos Aires, decorating the façade of the Italian pavilion, and the Brussels International Exposition decorating the ceiling the Italian pavilion in 1910.

=== Milano Marittima ===
Palanti was heavily involved in the development of the seaside resort Milano Marittima, north of Cervia. Originally an area of uncultivated coastal pine forests, in 1907 the Municipal Administration of Cervia ceded a vast area along the coast to the Maffei company, allowing them to build villas, parks and gardens in order to create a resort town. The Società Milano Marittima per lo sviluppo della spiaggia di Cervia (Milano Marittima Society for the development of the beach of Cervia) was created in 1911 to progress development, which Palanti quickly joined. He was an advocate of the garden city model, influenced by British urban planner Ebenezer Howard. His vision was of an urban project which would create a new city in which tourist accommodation blended with the surrounding nature. Designed to appeal to the middle class, it consisted of a series of decadent art nouveau villas set within the pine forest. In 1912 he drew up the master plan for the new municipality of Cervia and the plans for the first villas on the coast.

=== WW1 ===
In 1915 Palanti attempted to enlist in the Italian Air Force as an aviator during World War I. His application was rejected as the Ministry of Education (Ministero della Pubblica Istruzione) felt he would be of more use as a teacher. He did however contribute to the war effort, designing illustrated postcards and pamphlets which celebrated Italy and provided a source of anti-German propaganda. In 1917, together with his brother Mario, he developed a project for a naval machine: the 'Invulnerable Destroyer' (Distruttore invulnerabile).

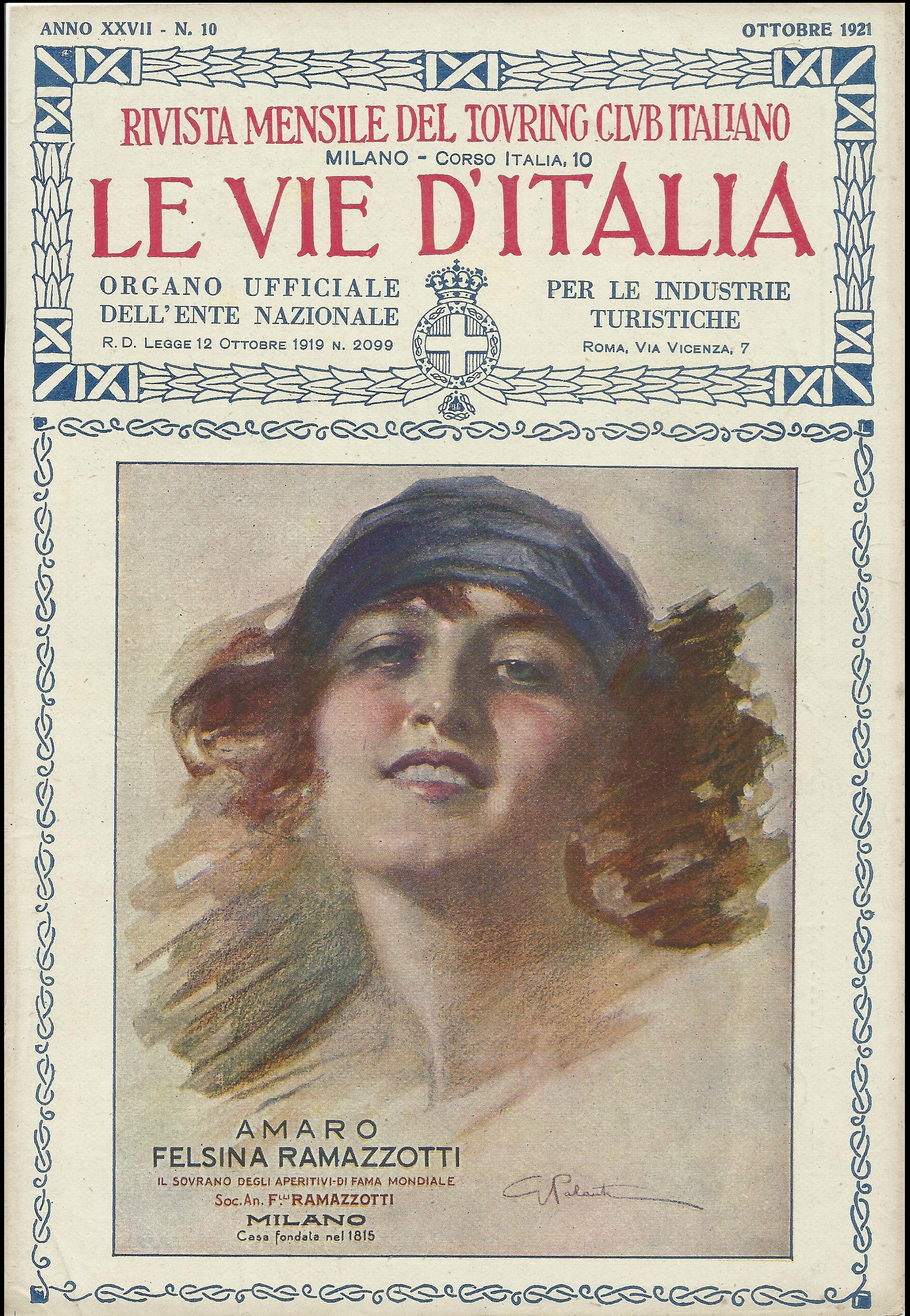
Le vie d'Italia: October 1921 Touring Club Italiano

=== Later life and death ===
In 1921 Palanti joined the Chiaro di Luna artistic and literary movement, working against the 'antics' of the avant-gardes. In 1923 he was appointed holder of the chair of decoration of the High School of the Brera Academy. In 1924 In the post war period, he began to produce prolific work for private clients amongst the Milanese bourgeoisie looking for portraiture, and occupied a role few contemporaries were offering. His clients included, amongst others, Mata Hari and Grazia Deledda. In 1924 he was commissioned by the Apostolic Nunciature to Argentina to paint a portrait of Pius XI. In 1925 he painted Vittorio Emanuele III and Queen Elena. In 1928 he painted a portrait of Benito Mussolini, which became one of the official images of il Duce, reproduced in newspapers and in the Encyclopedia Treccani. It remains to date one of the official portraits. In 1933 he became a member of the Higher Council of National Education (Ministero dell'Educazione Nazionale), who in 1934 appointed him vice president of the Brera Academy. In the 1940s he participated with his son, the architect Giancarlo Palanti, in the furnishing of the Villa Necchi at the Portalupa, painting numerous paintings including a portrait of Lina Ferrari Necchi measuring 294 cm x 400 cm. His career continued successfully until the early 1940s when WW2 impacted his ability to work. He died in 1946 in Milan at the age of 64, having last exhibited at La Società Patriottica. He is buried in the Monumental Cemetery of Milan (Cimitero Monumentale di Milano).

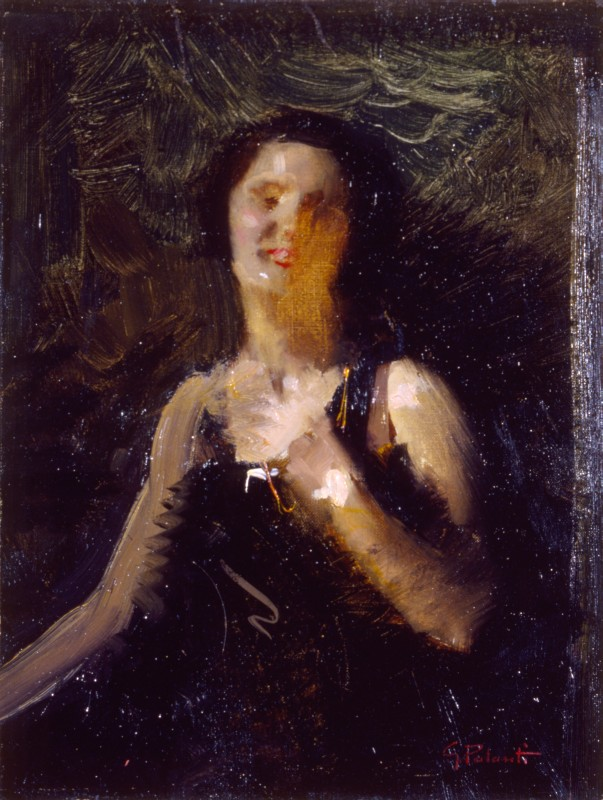
Study for female portrait, 1915-1920

=== Work and themes ===
Palanti was an eclectic artist, notably producing oil paintings, preferring portraits and nudes, as well as landscapes and waterscapes. He also worked with decorative arts, including fabric design, ceramics, stained glass, wrought iron, metal objects and furniture. He was an illustrator who produced graphics for posters and book covers, in addition to creating sketches for costume and set design for the Teatro alla Scala. In later life, he worked as an architect and urban planner, integral to the design of the seaside town Milano Marittima. His modernity looked to the strength, safety and joy of a middle and upper bourgeois class at the beginning of the twentieth century: industrialists, professionals, ladies of high society, who enjoyed a confident pre-war Italy in economic growth. Almost all of his activity, over the years, was oriented towards applied art, without however encroaching on a purely technical style, as in the case of graphics, inclined as he was instead to decorative solutions expressed in pictorial terms. Rich and multifaceted interventions in the so-called minor arts, from designs for fabrics to ceramics from Faenza, to stained glass windows, to wrought iron, to the applications of leather and metals for Ceruti furniture, to collaborations with the architect Gaetano Moretti. The creation of decorative paintings on bookshelves or furniture doors.

=== Personal life ===
Palanti was the older brother of architect Mario Palanti. He married Ada Romussi, daughter of politician and journalist Carlo Romussi, and was father to the architect Giancarlo Palanti and Maria Virginia.

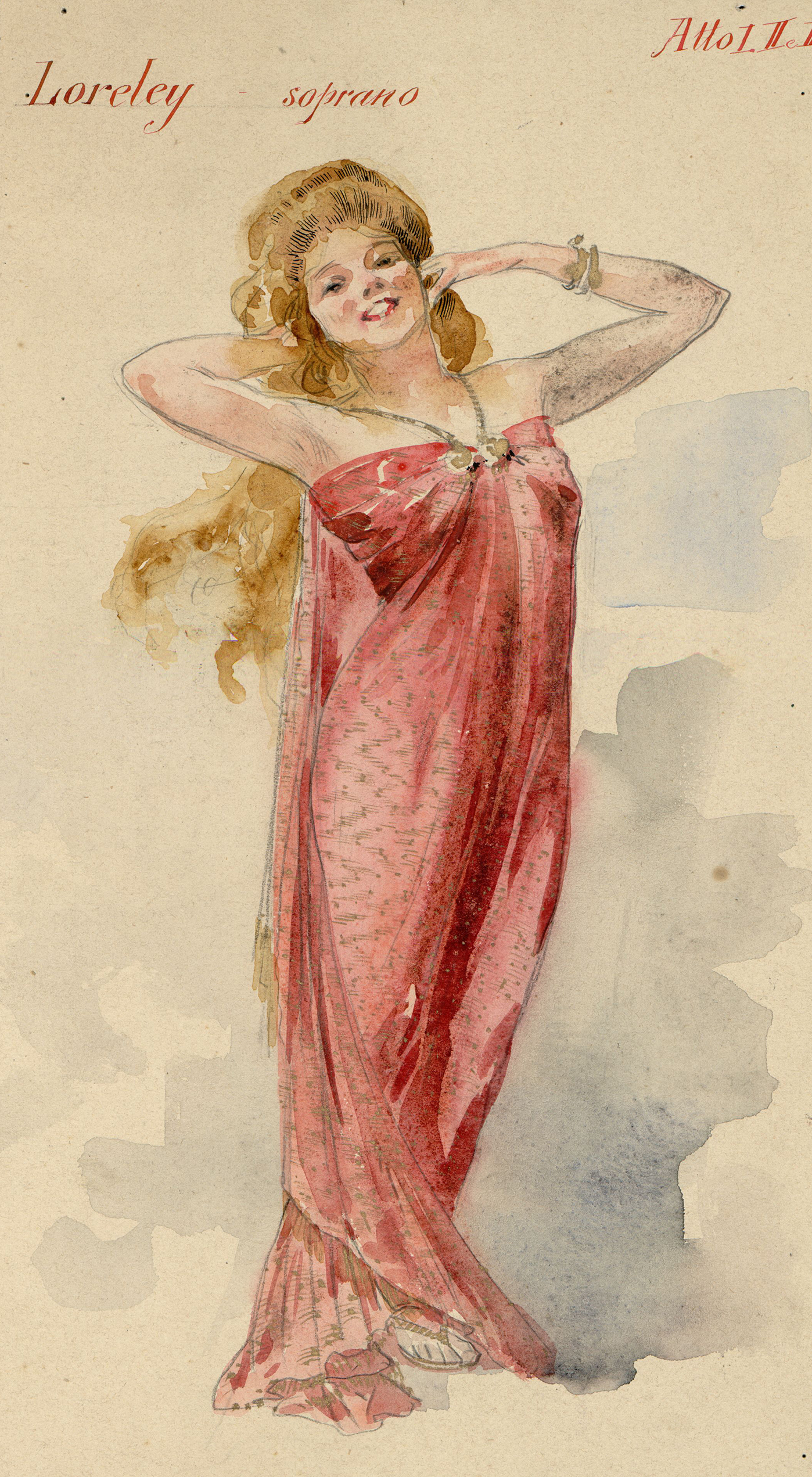
Loreley (soprano), costume design for Loreley act 1, 2, 3 (1905).

== Legacy ==
His pupils included Pina Sacconaghi, Francesco Carini, Carlo Ceci, Augusto Colombo, Goliardo Padova and Sigismondo Martini. Exhibitions recently dedicated to Palanti include the Spoleto Festival in 2001 the Civic Gallery Torre Avogadro in Lumezzane in 2003, and Giuseppe Palanti. Pittore, urbanista, illustratore in Cervia in 2012. The street Via Giuseppe Palanti in southern Milan is named after him, as is Viale Giuseppe Palanti in Cervia.

== Notable works ==
- Ritratto di Dante Tomasini, 1942, oil on canvas
- Ritratto di Graziosa Torriani Tomasini, 1942, oil on canvas
- Ritratto di Amilcare Beretta, 1943, oil on canvas
- Ritratto di Pio XI, 1924, oil on canvas
- Ritratto di Alessandro Volta, oil on canvas
- Ritratto di Mussolini (Il Macigno), 1928, oil on canvas
- Ritratto di Queen Elena, 1925, oil on canvas
- Ritratto di Vittorio Emanuele III, 1925, oil on canvas

== Honours and awards ==
- 1927 – Order of St. Sylvester, Commander
- 1905 Medaglia d'Oro, Augusto Baelz, Mostra d'Arte Applicata alla Pubblicità

== See also ==
- Palanti
- Mario Palanti
- Teatro alla Scala

== Bibliography ==
- Rossana Bossaglia (1972). Giuseppe Palanti. Un pittore a Milano fra scapigliatura e novecento. Milano: Edizioni La Rete.
- Alberto Casella; Paola Morelli (1995). Catalogo Bolaffi del Manifesto Italiano. Torino: Giulio Bolaffi Editore. ISBN 88-85846-57-2.
- Giampiero Mughini; Maurizio Scudiero (1997). Il manifesto pubblicitario italiano. Milano: Nuova Arti Grafiche Ricordi.
- Vittoria Crespi Morbio; Susanna Massari (2001). Giuseppe Palanti, pittura, teatro, pubblicità, disegno. Torino: Umberto Allemandi & C. ISBN 88-422-1072-2.
- Tiziana Giansiracusa; Domenico Montalto (2003). Giuseppe Palanti, opere inedite dal Museo Teatrale alla Scala e da collezioni private. Roccafranca: La Compagnia della Stampa-Massetti Rodella Editori. ISBN 88-8486-055-5.
- Anna Villari (2012). Giuseppe Palanti, pittore, urbanista, illustratore. Cinisello Balsamo: Silvana Editoriale. ISBN 978-88-366-2363-1.
- Vittoria Crespi Morbio (2012). Giuseppe Palanti, Belle Époque in teatro, 1903–1916. Torino: Umberto Allemandi & C. ISBN 978-88-422-2197-5.
