= Francesco Gianotti =

Italian architect

Francisco Gianotti

Francesco Gianotti (Francisco in Spanish; April 4, 1881 – February 13, 1967) was an Italian-Argentine architect who designed many important Art Nouveau buildings in Buenos Aires, Argentina.

Born in 1881 in Lanzo, near Turin, Italy, he graduated as an architect from the Fine Arts Academy of Turin in 1904, together with his brother, Giovanni Battista. In 1905 the two brothers took a post-graduate course together in Brussels and later they designed various pavilions for the 1906 International Exhibition in Milan.

Gianotti arrived in Buenos Aires, in 1909 where, together with his compatriot, Mario Palanti, he took charge of the construction and decoration of the Italian Pavilion at the International Centennial Exposition of 1910. In 1911 he opened his own studio and started to work on the design of residential houses and apartment buildings, using a mixture of Italian and French styles. Unlike his colleagues Virginio Colombo and Mario Palanti, who worked for wealthy compatriots, Gianotti was also commissioned by upper class Argentine clients for whom he undertook projects in the Beaux Arts style.

Following work on a number of apartment buildings and private residences, Gianotti was commissioned to design the La Inmobiliaria Building (on Avenida de Mayo) in 1910, and Galería Güemes in Florida Street, possibly one of his best works, in 1913; with 14 floors, and a height of 80 m, it was considered to be the first skyscraper in Buenos Aires. Two years later, in 1915, a famous local confectioner, Cayetano Brenna, commissioned him to design the Confitería El Molino. Located on the corner of Callao and Rivadavia Avenues, the building became a well-known landmark in the city. Until 1918 he designed mainly in the Art Nouveau style, but later employed a more orthodox Eclecticism combining Italianate and Moorish revival styles, notably in the Italian-American Navigation Company Building (1927) on 622 Diagonal Norte Avenue. Gianotti also created works of Neoclassical architecture, notably the El Mundo newspaper offices on 647 Diagonal Norte (1925), and the Schaffhausen Building (336 Reconquista St.), in 1932.

Gianotti completed his last project in 1959, and he died in Buenos Aires on 13 February 1967.

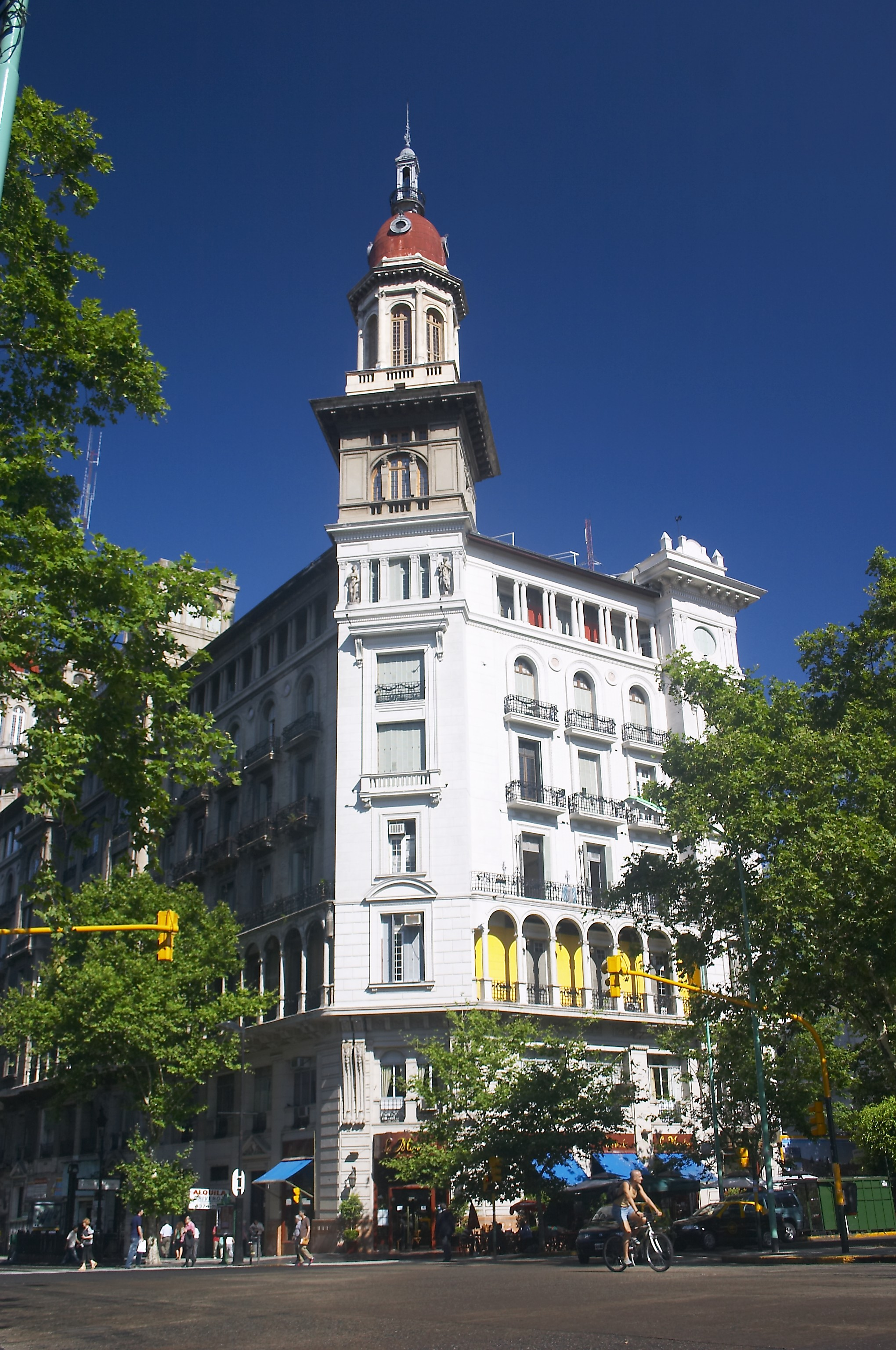
La Inmobiliaria ("Realty Building")

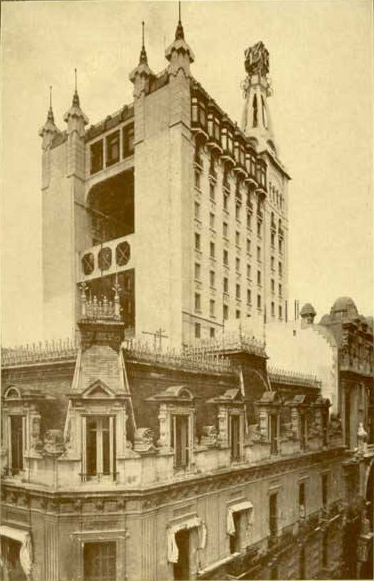
Galería Güemes

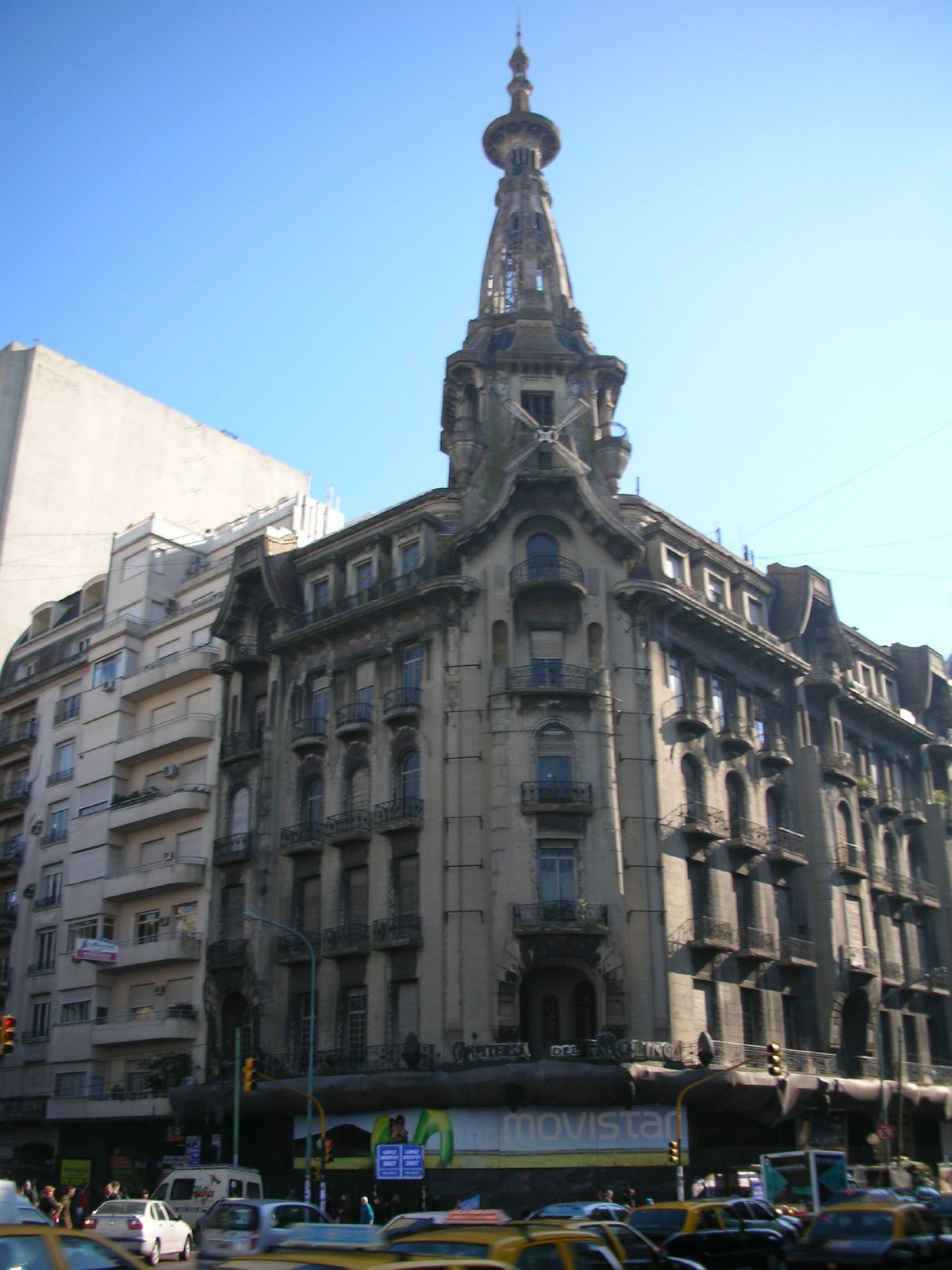
El Molino ("Windmill Café")
