= Augusto Colombo =

Italian painter (1902–1969)

Augusto Colombo (1902 in Milan – 1969) was an Italian painter.

After attending the school of arts and crafts run by the Società Umanitaria in Milan, Colombo enrolled at the Brera Academy for the evening classes taught by Giuseppe Palanti and then Ambrogio Alciati’s course of nude studies. He was awarded the Cesare Sarfatti Prize in 1924, which enabled him to spend the next two years in Rome, Florence and Paris. Having returned to Milan, he took part in the city’s exhibitions with portraits and large-scale compositions on social and religious subjects. The art school he opened in his studio in 1933 had over 800 pupils during its 36 years of operation. A militant antifascist, he depicted the horrors of war in a series of works during World War II and subsequently played a leading role in Milan’s cultural life, founding the magazine Valori and promoting the activities of the Famiglia Meneghina organisation. The large-scale compositions on religious subjects were combined in later years with numerous cycles of decorative works.

== Gallery ==
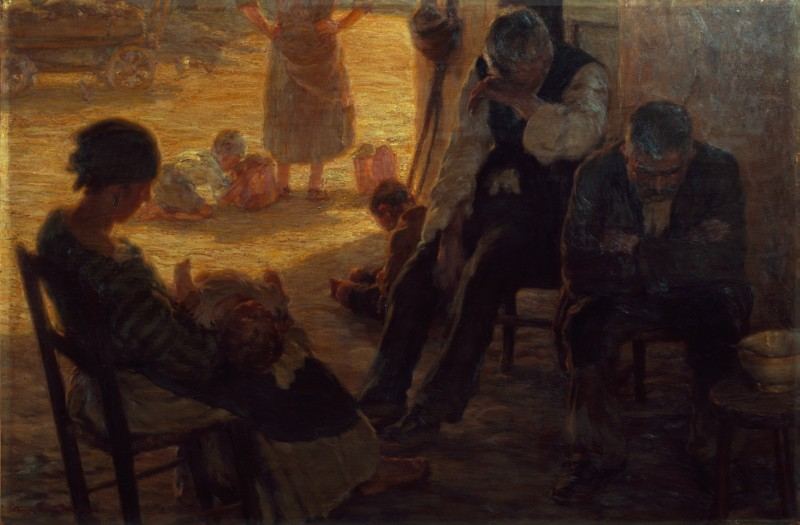
La siesta, 1924

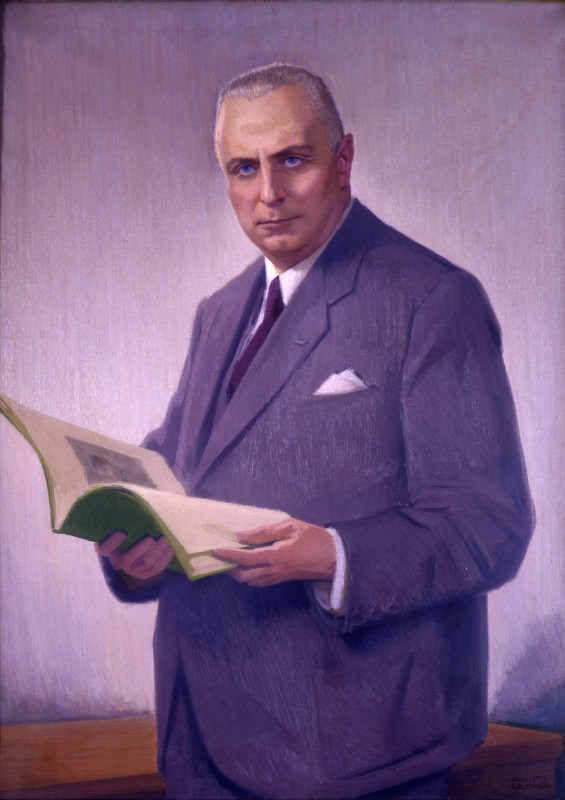
Ritratto del conte Stefano Jacini, 1953

== Other projects ==
Media related to Augusto Colombo at Wikimedia Commons
