= Palladius =

Palladius is a name that may refer to:

== People ==
Ordered chronologically.

=== Given name ===
- Palladius of Antioch (died 309), also known as Palladius the Hermit, Christian saint
- Palladius (prefect), prefect of Alexandria in 373
- Palladius of Ratiaria (fl. 381), Arian Christian theologian
- Palladius of Galatia (360s–420s) also known as Palladius Helenopolitanus, the author of Historia Lausiaca
- Palladius (Caesar) (420–455), son of Western Roman Emperor Petronius Maximus, Caesar of the Western Roman Empire
- Palladius (bishop of Ireland) (died ca. 457/461), first bishop of the Christians of Ireland
- Palladius of Embrun (died c. 541 AD), bishop of Embrun
- Palladius of Saintes, 6th-century bishop of Saintes in Gaul
- Palladius (physician), 6th or 7th century author of two books of commentary on Hippocrates

=== Ancient Roman cognomen ===
- Rutilius Taurus Aemilianus Palladius, late 4th-early 5th century Roman agricultural writer usually known as Palladius
- Junius Quartus Palladius (fl. 408–421), Praetorian Prefect in the Western Roman Empire

=== Other people ===
- Peder Palladius (1503–1560), first Lutheran bishop of the Church of Denmark
- Palladius (Kafarov), monastic name of Pyotr Ivanovich Kafarov (1817–1878), early Russian sinologist and Eastern Orthodox monk

== Other uses ==
- Palladius (wine), a cult wine label by the Sadie Family, a South African producer

== See also ==
- Palladius table, a table of Palladius system syllables for the cyrillization of Chinese
- Palladio (disambiguation)
- Palladium (disambiguation)
- Palladas
