= Hotel Castelar =

Hotel in Buenos Aires, Argentina

Coordinates: 34°36′32″S 58°22′58″W

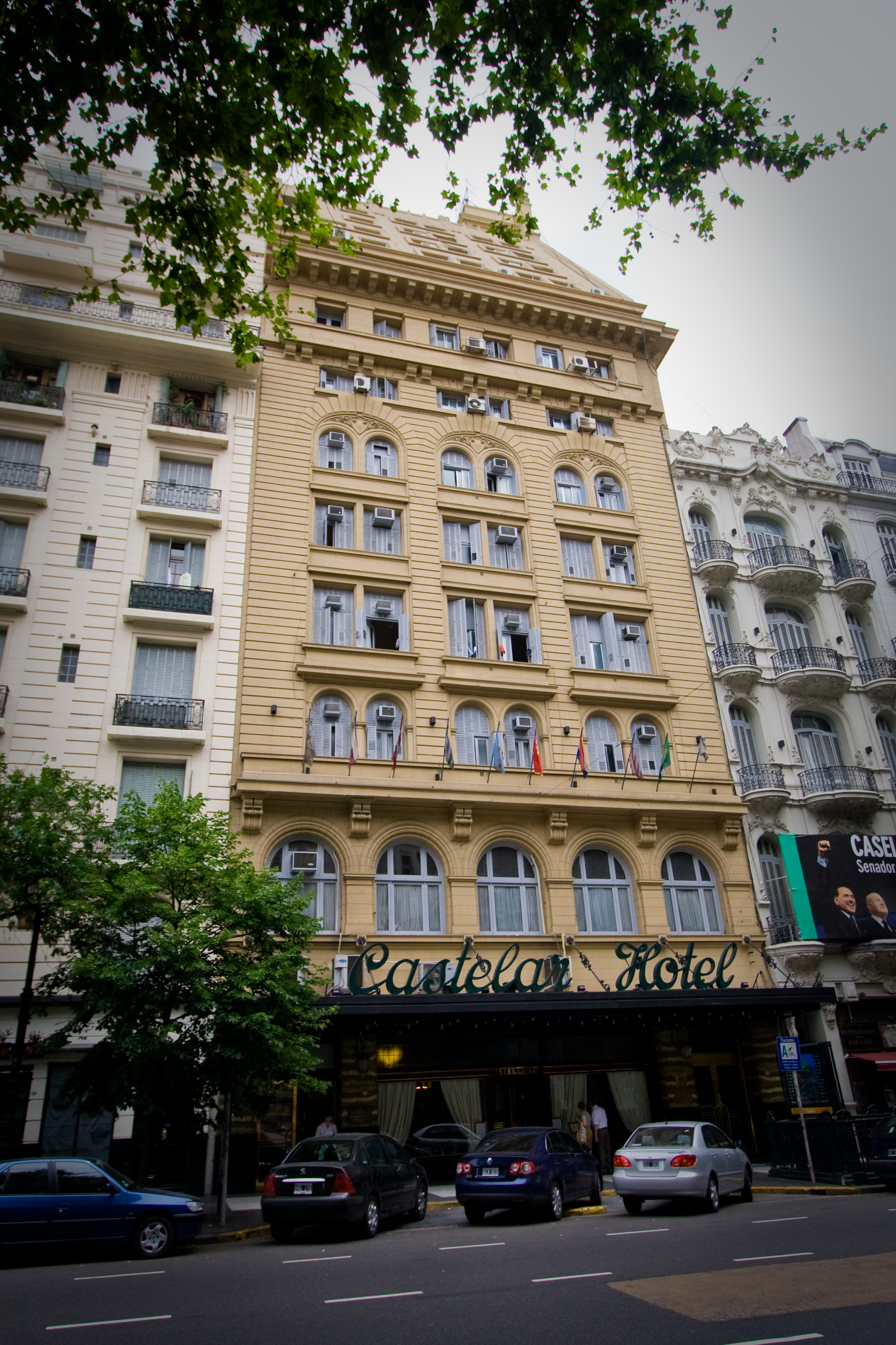
Hotel Castelar

Hotel Castelar was a hotel located at the northwest intersection of May and 9th of July Avenues, in the downtown Montserrat section of Buenos Aires, Argentina. It operated for 90 years, closing in 2020 as a result of the coronavirus pandemic.

Opened in 1928 as the Hotel Excelsior, the building was designed by Italian architect Mario Palanti and built by local engineer José Pinzone. The Spanish poet and dramatist, Federico García Lorca, stayed here from October 1933 to March 1934 while his play, Bodas de Sangre, was being performed at the Avenida Theatre nearby; his erstwhile room has been preserved as a museum. More recently, the hotel was the site of Vice President Carlos Álvarez's dramatic, October 6, 2000, resignation, a milestone helping lead to President Fernando de la Rúa's own departure a year later.

== The Hotel in film ==
Many movies were filmed inside the hotel.

- 1986 Poor Butterfly
- 1988 Peculiar Attraction
- 1999 Claim, with Billy Zane
- 2001 Gallito Ciego with Rodrigo de la Serna
