= Mario Palanti =

Italian architect (1885–1978)

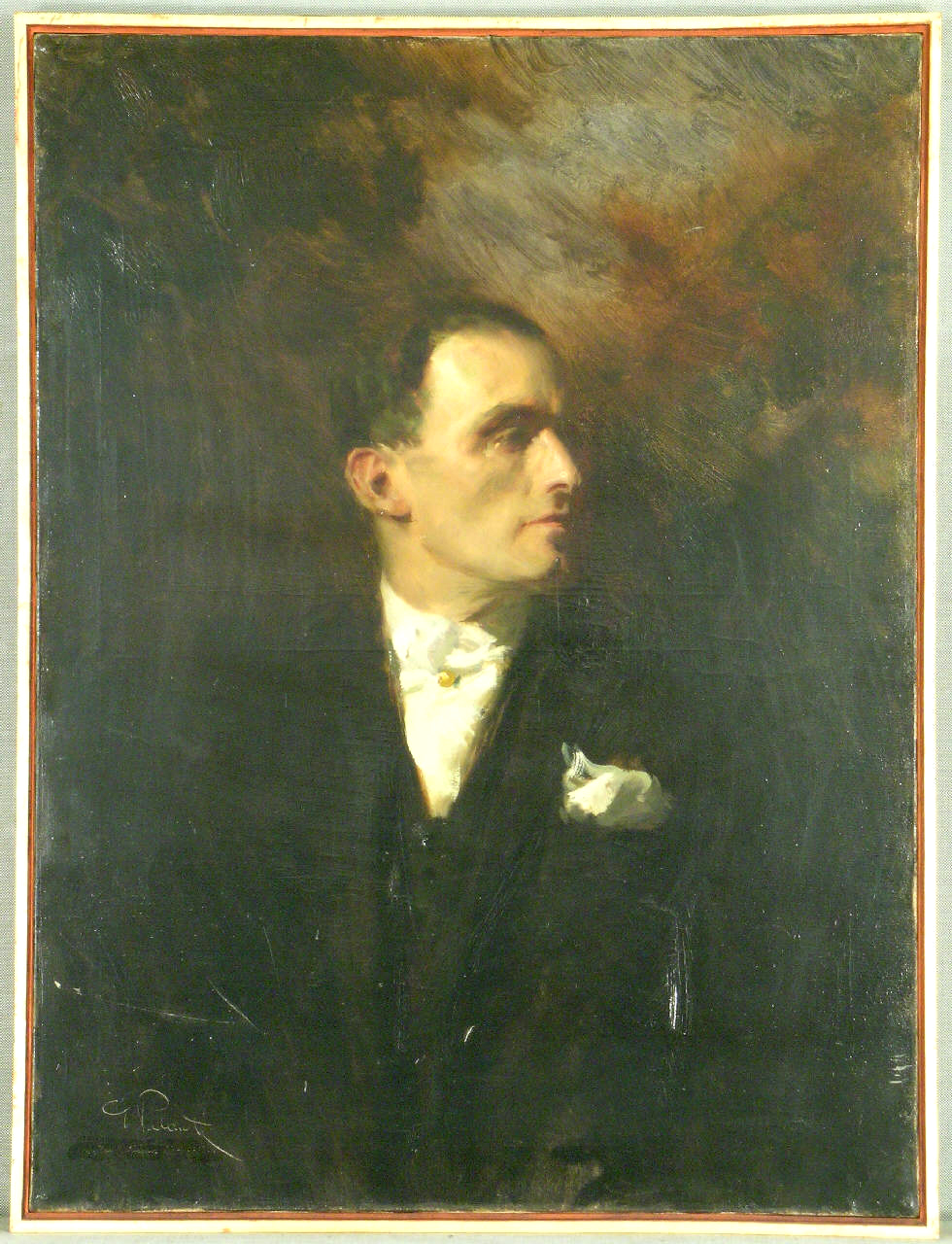
- Portrait of Mario Palanti by Giuseppe Palanti (1881–1946)
- Born: September 20, 1885; Milan, Italy
- Died: September 4, 1978 (aged 92); Milan
- Education: Brera Academy; Politecnico di Milano
- Occupation: Architect
- Awards: Order of the Crown of Italy, Commander
- Buildings: Palacio Barolo, Palacio Salvo, Hotel Castelar

Mario Palanti (September 20, 1885 – September 4, 1978) was an Italian architect who designed important buildings in the capital cities of both Argentina and Uruguay.

== Life and career ==
Born in 1885 in Milan, Italy, the brother of painter Giuseppe Palanti, Palanti studied architecture in the Brera Academy and in the Politecnico di Milano university. Mario was the son of Giovanni Palanti, a carpenter, and of Virginia De Gasperi, a dressmaker.

Soon after graduation he received a gold medal at the International Exhibition in Brussels and arrived in Buenos Aires in 1909 with a commission to manage, with the help of his compatriot, Francisco Gianotti, the construction of the Italian Pavilion for the Exposición Internacional del Centenario (1910).

For nearly 20 years he worked on both sides of the River Plate for wealthy compatriot clients. During the period 1909-1919 his designs employed variations of Renaissance Revival and Art Nouveau styles and there then followed a period during which he carried out his most impressive work in Buenos Aires including Palacio Barolo and Hotel Castelar, both in Avenida de Mayo; an apartment building on the corner of Santa Fe Avenue and Callao Avenue; and Palacio Chrysler (today known as Palacio Alcorta) which had an automobile test track on its roof, similar to the first FIAT factory in Turin. During this period he also designed the Palacio Salvo in Montevideo, and produced a large number of drawings for monumental buildings that were never built. In the final period of his work, after he returned to live in Italy in 1930, he undertook a series of projects that never materialised. He was the inventor of Palandomus.

Palanti died in his native Milan in 1978. He was interred in the Civico Mausoleo Palanti, a Cimitero Monumentale di Milano mausoleum for notable local citizens of his own design.

== Notable works ==
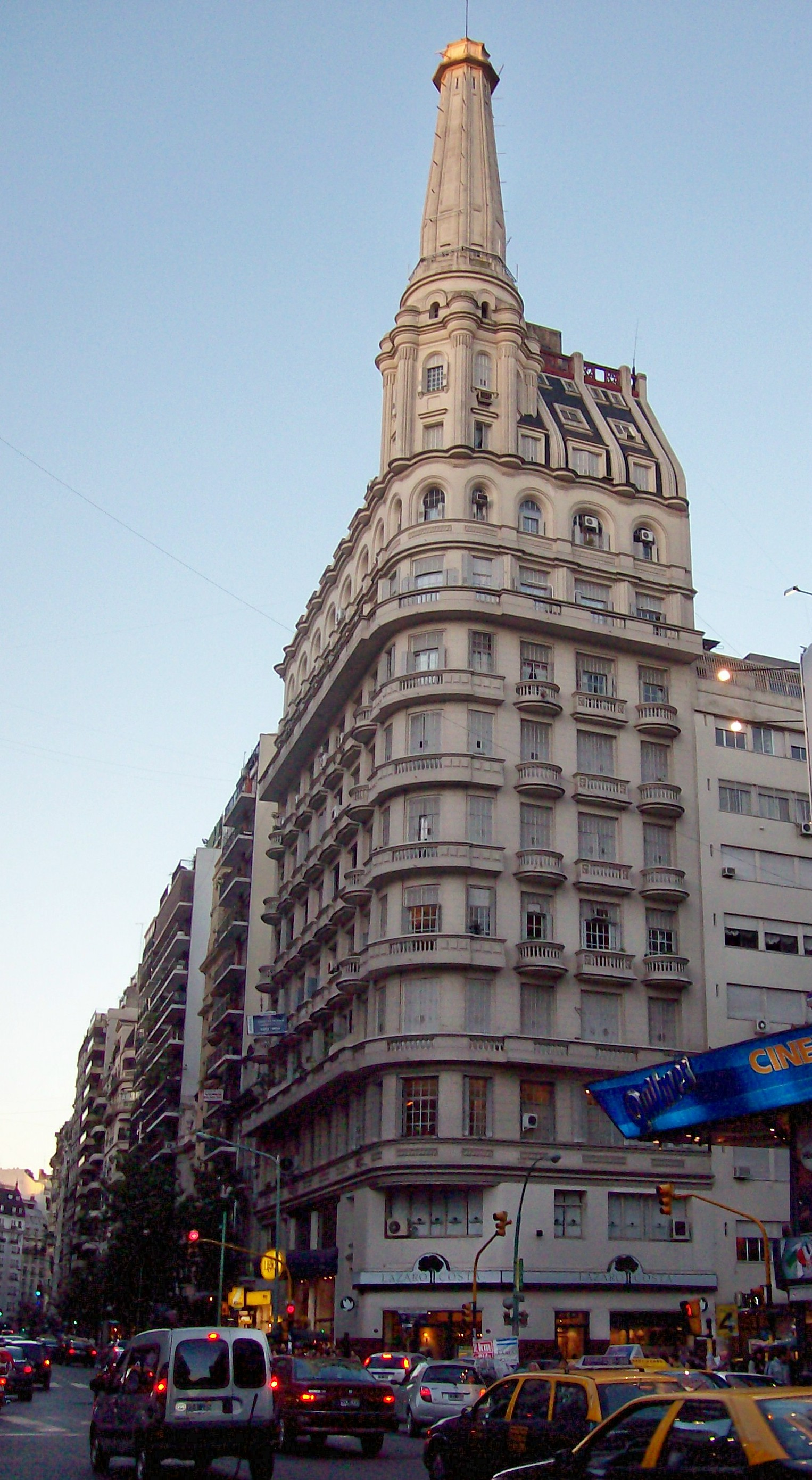
Roccatagliata Building (1920)

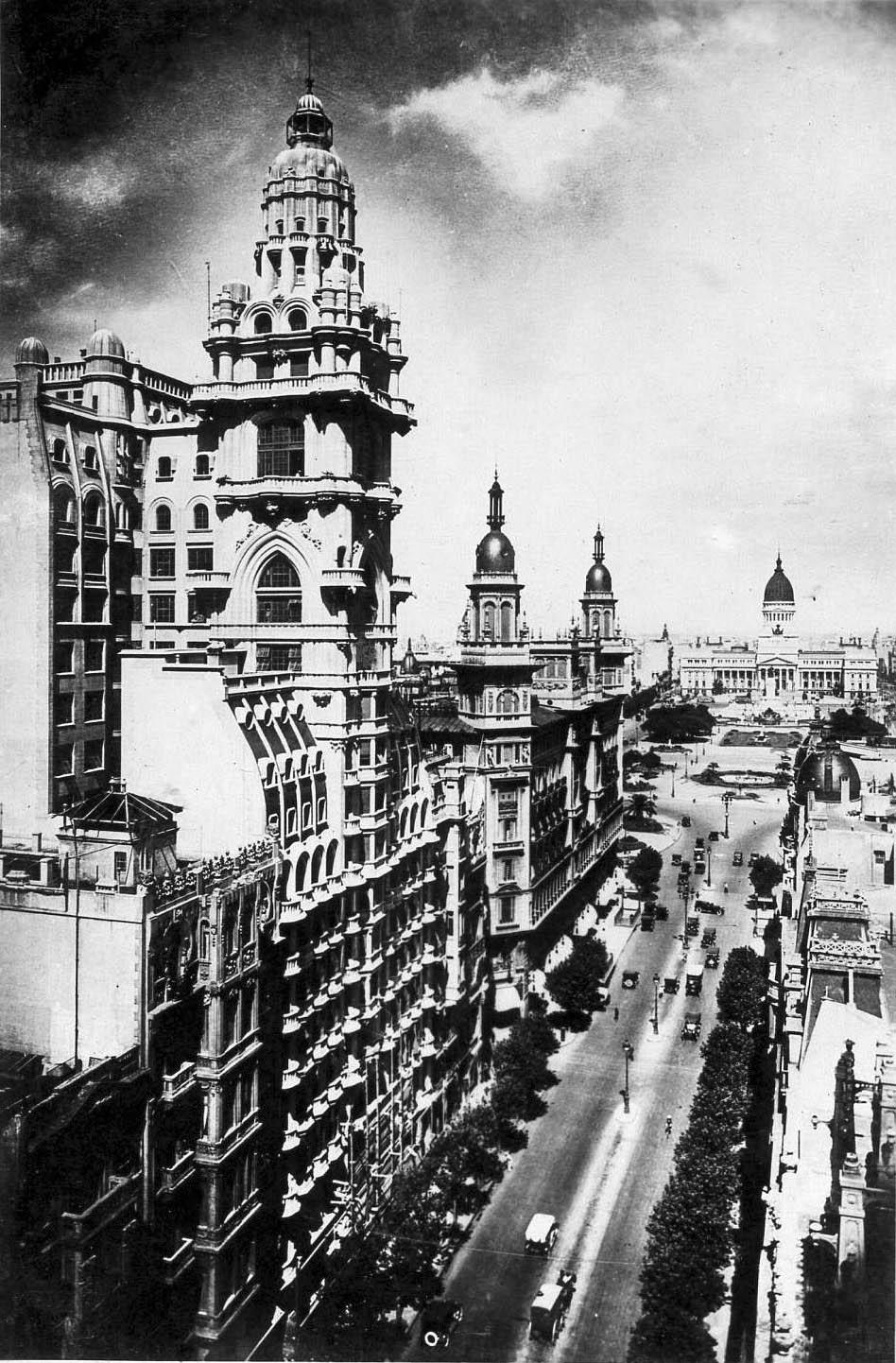
Palacio Barolo, Buenos Aires (1923)

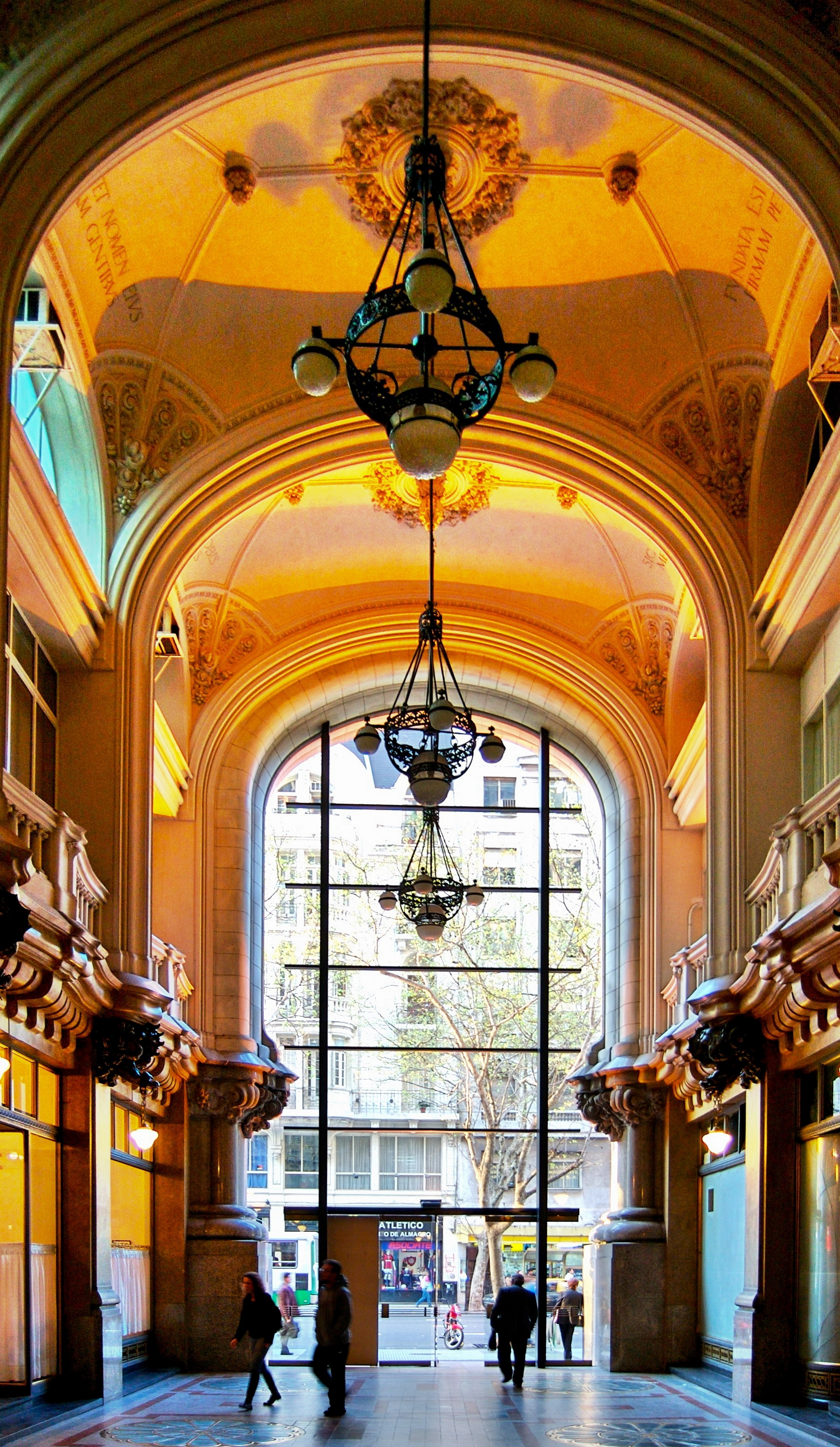
Palacio Barolo, Entrance Hall

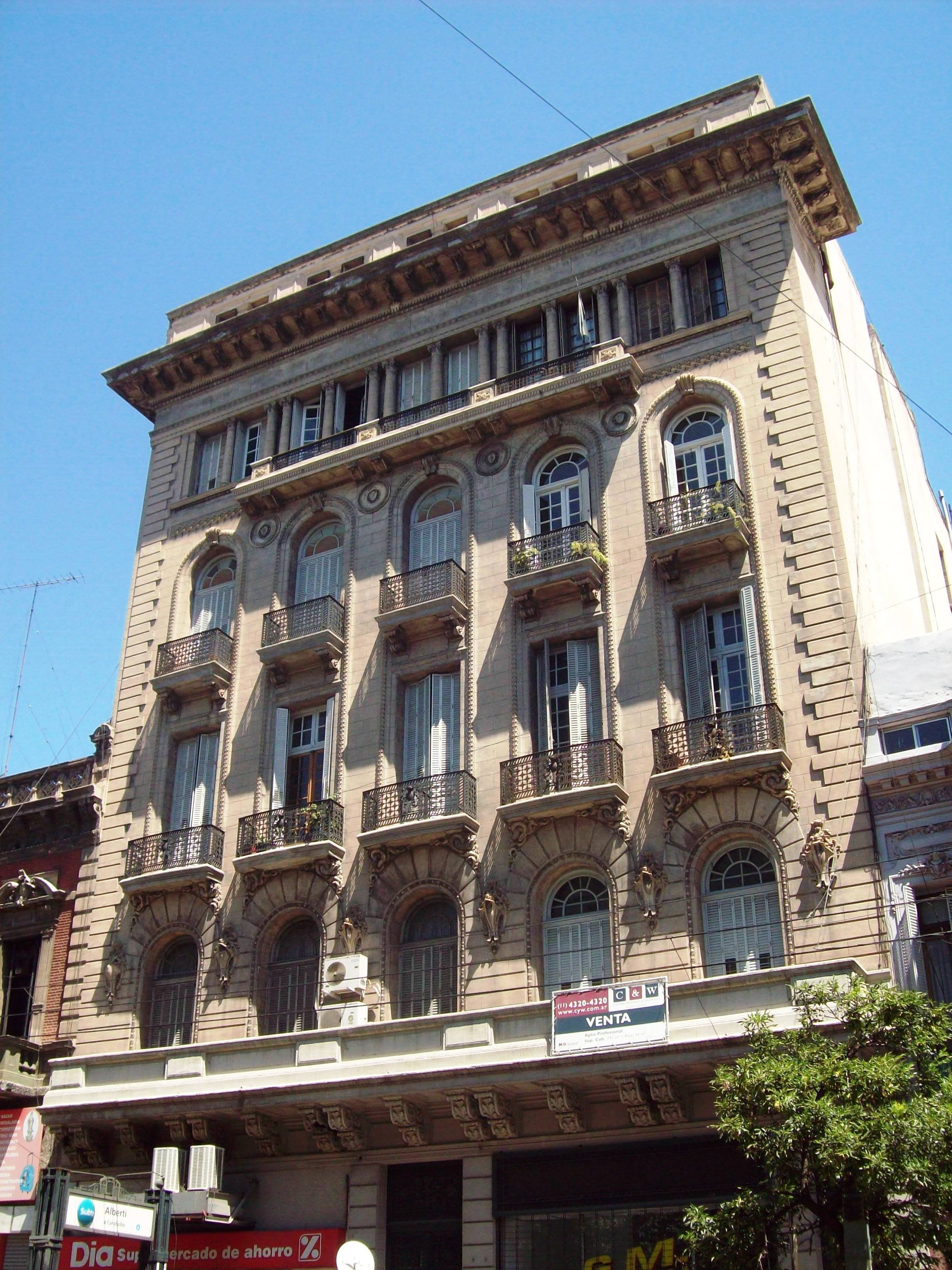
Uboldi Building (1924)

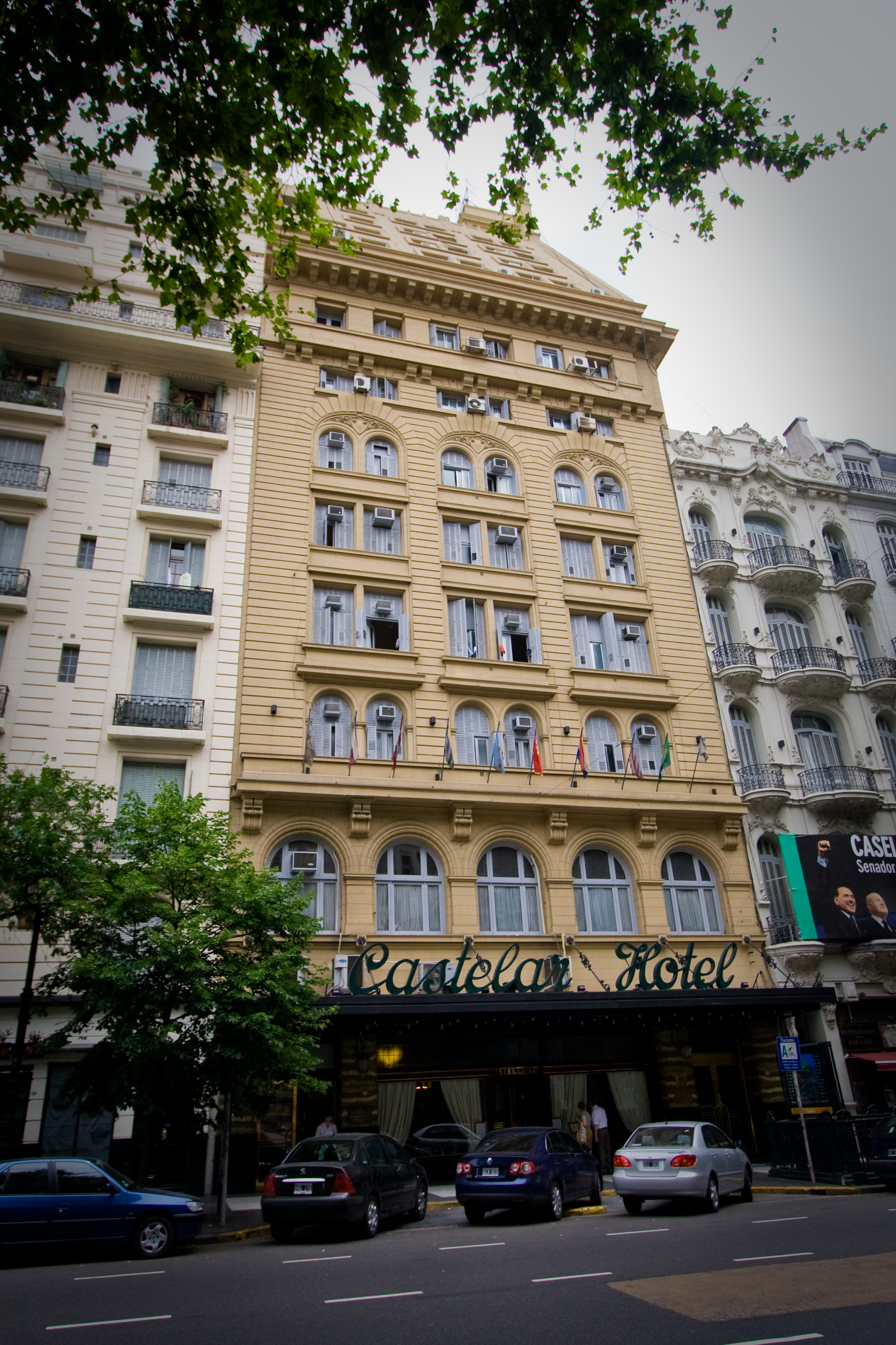
Hotel Castelar (1928)

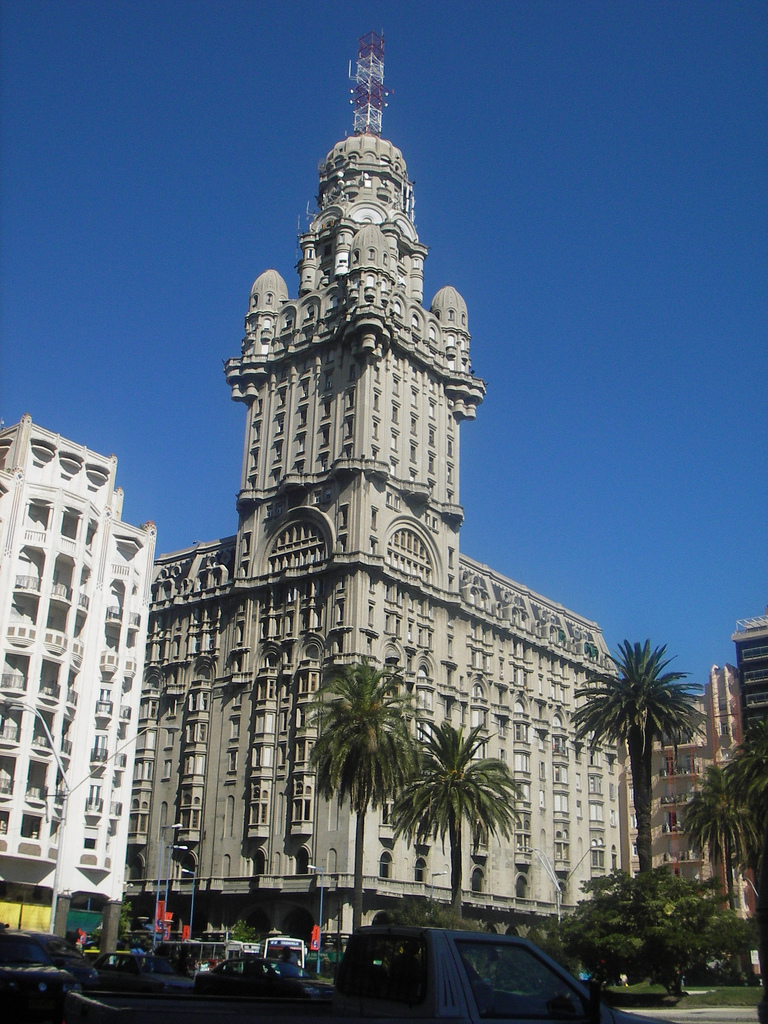
Palacio Salvo, Montevideo (1928)

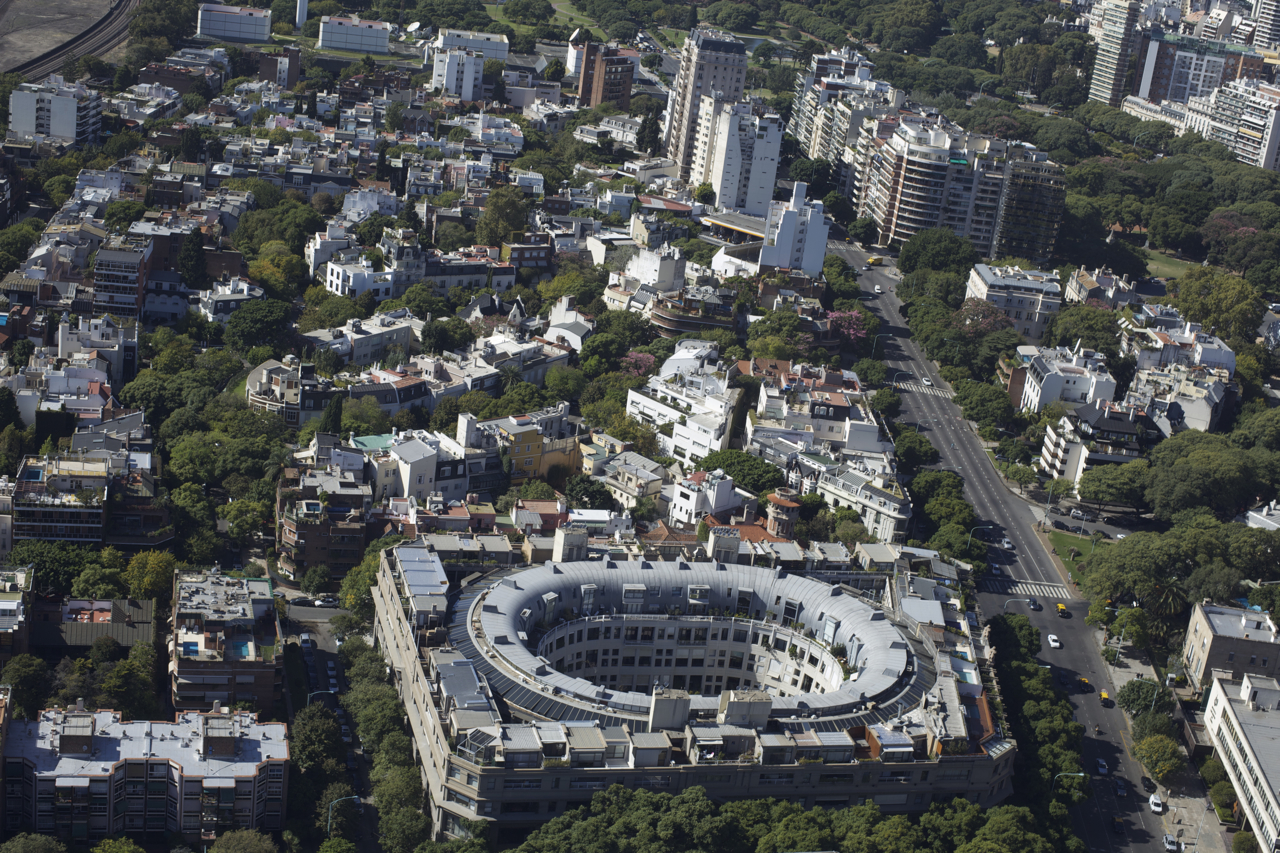
Palacio Alcorta (foreground, 1928)

== Orders ==
Order of the Crown of Italy, Commander

== Bibliography ==
- Mario Palanti, Prima esposizione personale d'architettura nella Repubblica Argentina, Milano, Stab. di arti grafiche Rizzoli e Pizzio, 1917 Università di Bologna
- Mario Palanti, Cinque anni di lavoro, Casa Editrice de Arte Bestetti & Tumminelli, 1924 - 152 pagine
- Mario Palanti, Auditorium: progetti, Roma, anno XIII E.F., Editore Rizzoli, 1935 - 33 pagine
- Mario Palanti, Torre Littoria: progetti, Milano, anno XIII E.F, Editore Rizzoli, 1935 - 46 pagine
- Mario Palanti, Architettura per tutti, editore E. Bestetti, 1946 - 303 pagine
- Mimi Böhm, Buenos Aires, Art Nouveau, Ediciones Xavier Verstraeten, Buenos Aires, 2005.

== See also ==
- Civico Mausoleo Palanti
- Palandomus
