= Exposición Internacional del Centenario =

1910 exhibition in Argentina

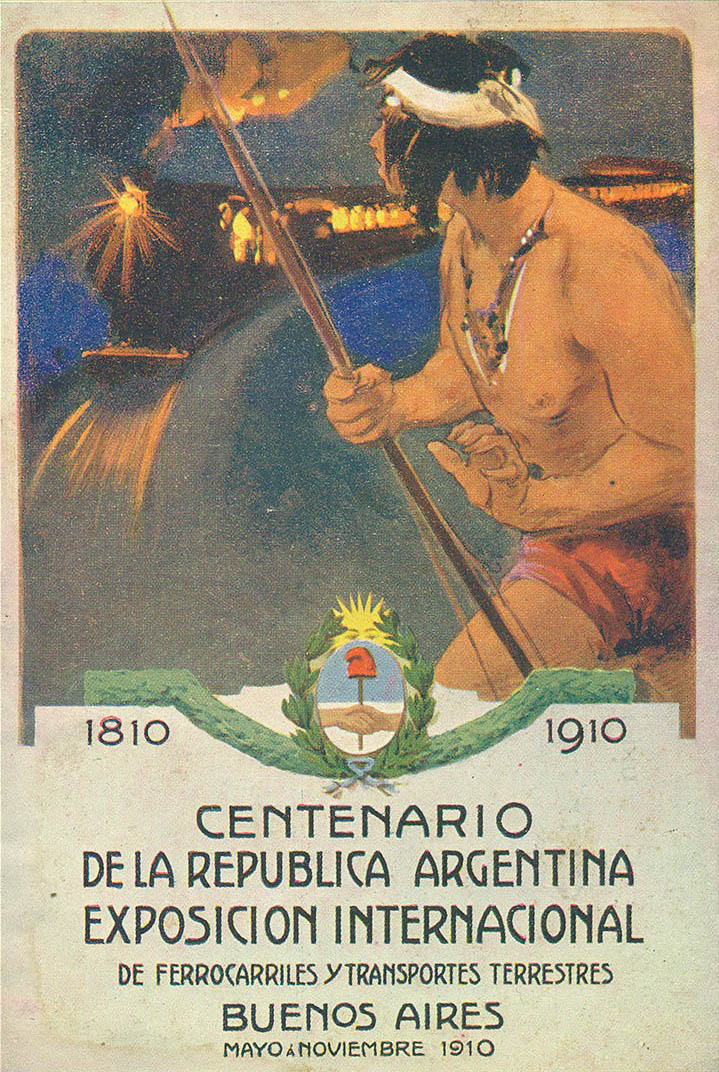
- Post card promoting the Railways and Overland Transport Exhibition

Overview
- BIE-class: Unrecognized exposition
- Name: Exposición Internacional del Centenario
- Organized by: Government of Argentina; Sociedad Rural Argentina; Sociedad Médica; Unión Industrial

Location
- Country: Argentina
- City: Buenos Aires

Timeline
- Opening: May 1910
- Closure: November 1910

The Argentine Centennial International Exhibition (Spanish: Exposición Internacional del Centenario Argentino) was an exhibition held between May and November 1910 in Buenos Aires, to commemorate the Centennial of the May Revolution in Argentina (the formation of the first local government on May 25, 1810). With a population of around 1.2 million, Buenos Aires was then the largest urban complex in Latin America, the eighth city in the world, and one of the richest. As the capital city and main port of the young Argentine Republic at the height of its economic expansion, the city was growing rapidly with the successive waves of European immigration.

== Summary ==
A total of 20 pavilions were built specially for the exhibition. A number of young Italian architects, including Virginio Colombo, Francisco Gianotti and Mario Palanti who designed the Italian pavilion, went on to establish successful careers in Buenos Aires working in a number of styles, including Art Nouveau. Their buildings were some of the most important of the 20th century in Buenos Aires and those that remain continue to play a significant role in defining the city's architectural landscape.

Each pavilion feature a different theme, such as:

- Agriculture and Cattle Raising – Organised by the Sociedad Rural Argentina, this was housed in a pavilion within the organisation's house in Palermo. It and contained an exhibition of agricultural activities and products from various parts of the country.
- Industry – This was located on what today is Del Libertador Avenue near El Rosedal, and featured industrial machinery much of which had never been seen before in Argentina. The only major pavilion still standing from any of the expositions is the Postal Service Pavilion from the Industrial Exhibition.
- Railways and Overland Transport – An exhibition of the latest automobiles from Europe, yachts, aeroplanes, railway locomotives, carriages and wagons. The pavilion, designed by Italian architect Virginio Colombo, was located near the Hipódromo de Palermo. It was the most attended exhibition.
- Hygiene - this was located on the Unzué Residence gardens, now occupied by the Argentine National Library.
- Fine Arts - this was located in the "Argentine Pavilion", a steel structure covered in ceramics and multi-coloured glass designed by French architect Albert Ballu for the 1889 Exposition Universelle of Paris, where it stood next to the newly built Eiffel Tower. By 1910 the pavilion had been relocated in Plaza San Martín, opposite the Plaza Hotel. The pavilion would be dismantled in 1933.

In addition there were pavilions for several of the Argentine provinces, including Córdoba, Mendoza, Salta, Jujuy and Tucumán, and for countries including Spain, Italy, Germany, England, Switzerland, Austro-Hungarian Empire and Paraguay. The Art Nouveau style played an important role in the designs of many of the buildings.

== Gallery ==
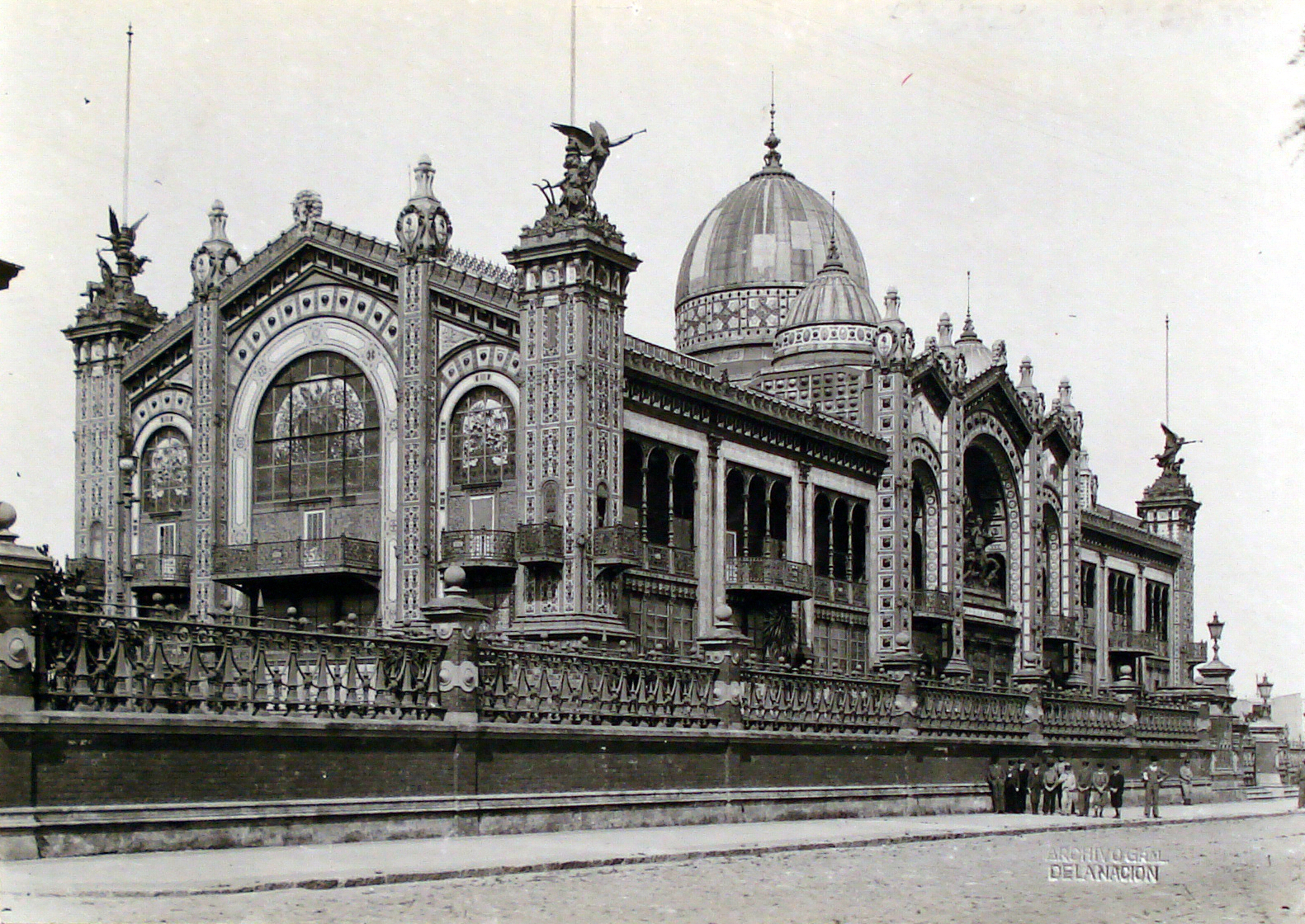
The Argentine Pavilion at the Fine Arts Exhibition

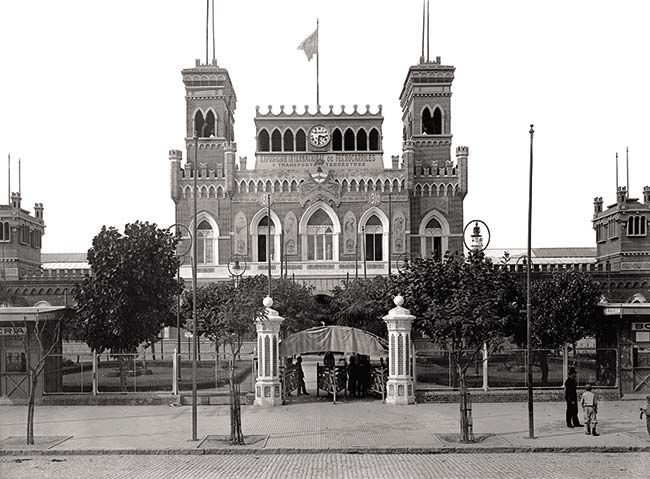
Railway exhibition pavilion

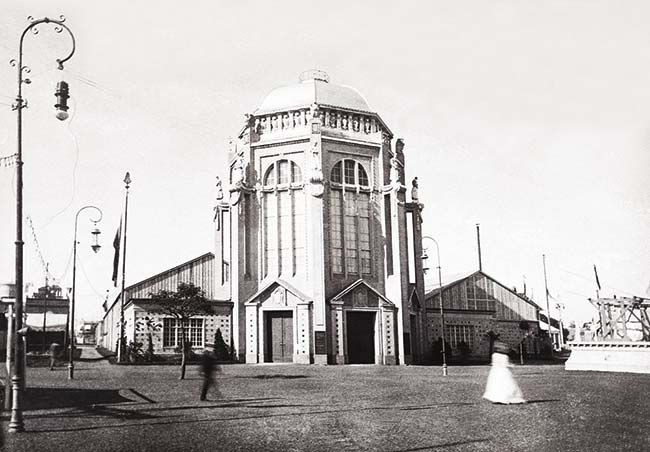
Germany pavilion

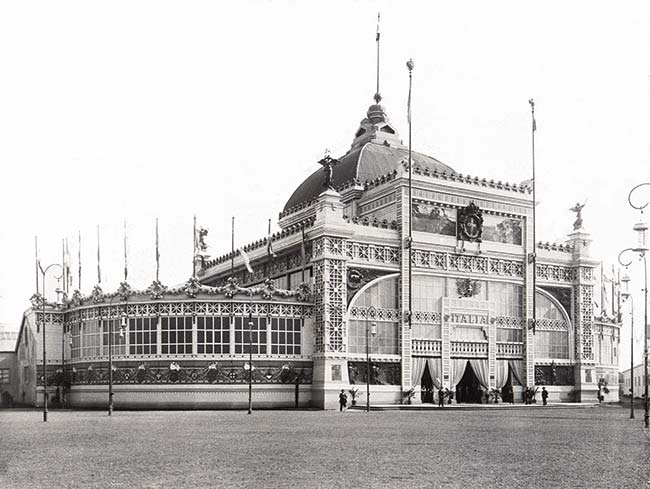
Italy pavilion

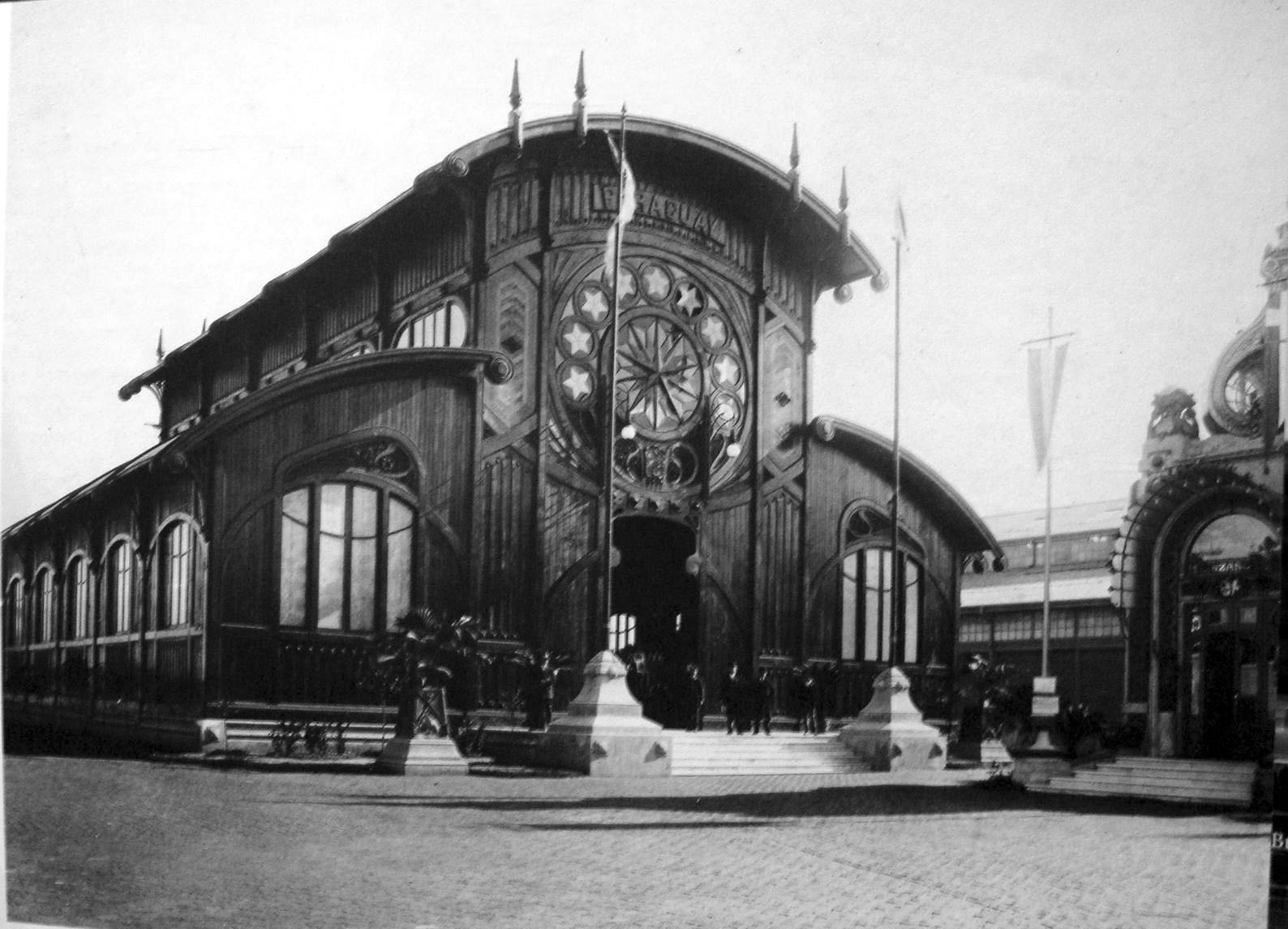
Paraguay pavilion

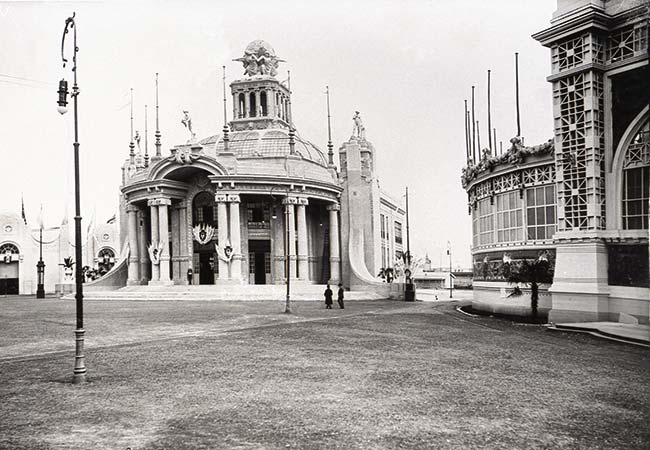
Argentine post office pavilion

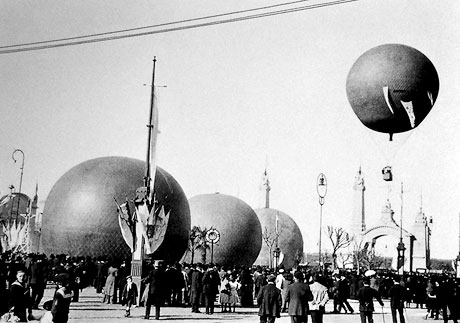
Balloons race

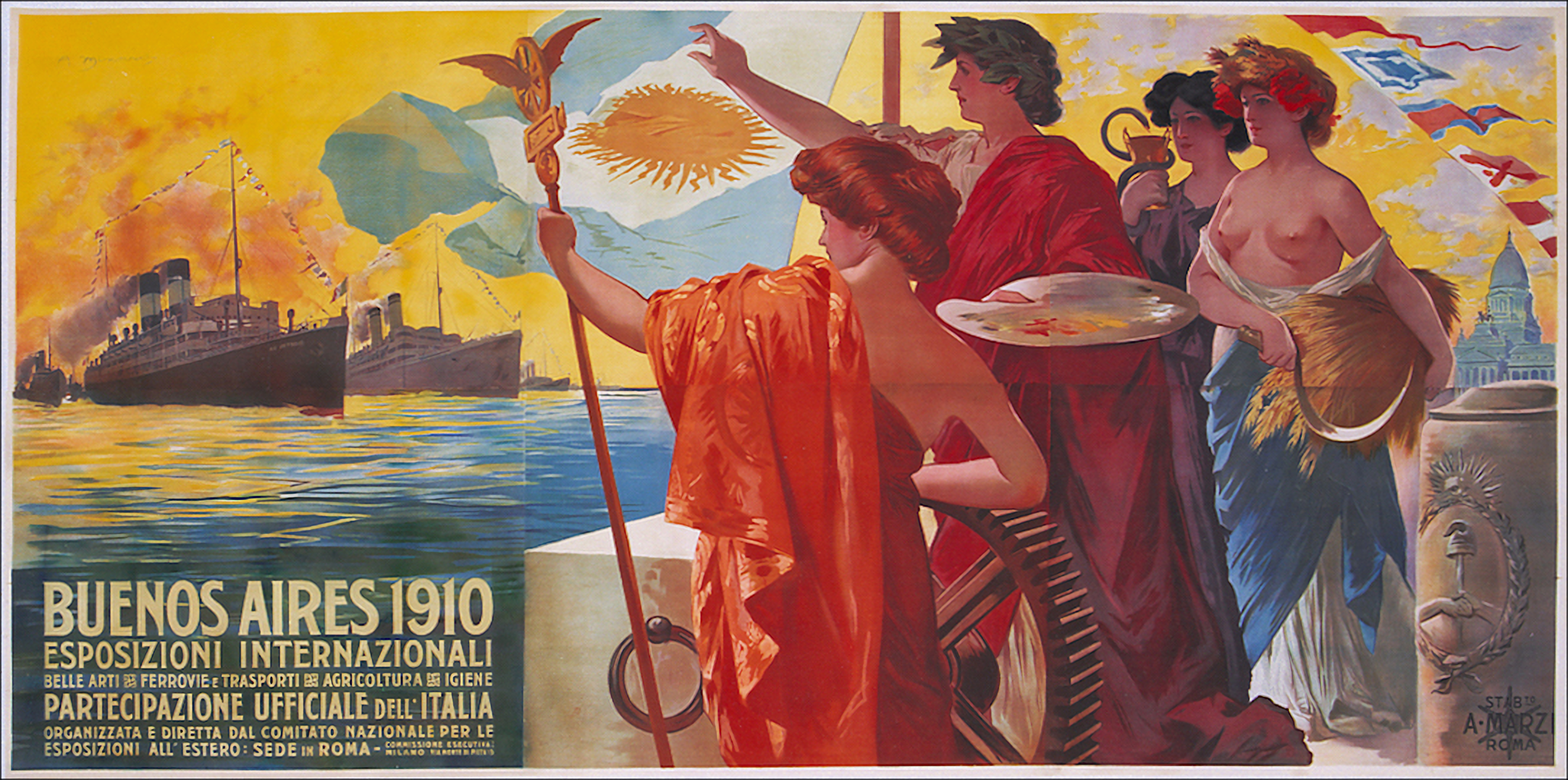
Advertising illustration by Adriano Minardi

== See also ==
- Argentina Centennial
- History of Argentina
- May Revolution

== Bibliography ==
- Mimi Böhm, Buenos Aires, Art Nouveau, Ediciones Xavier Verstraeten, Buenos Aires, 2005.
- El pasado en imágenes. La exposición internacional del Centenario. Ferrocarriles y Transportes Terrestres, Ciencia Hoy magazine
