= Virginio Colombo =

Italian architect

Virginio Colombo (1884–1927) was a prolific Italian architect later active in Buenos Aires, Argentina.

== Biography ==
Born in 1884 in Milan, Italy, Colombo studied architecture in the Brera Academy under Giuseppe Sommaruga, the city's leading exponent of the Art Nouveau style.

Colombo arrived in Buenos Aires in 1906, along with two other Italian architects, Aquiles de Lazzari and Mario Baroffio Covati, with a contract to carry out the decoration of the Palacio de Justicia (the Law Courts). Soon after his arrival in Buenos Aires, he became director of a studio and later set up his own, working mainly on projects for private clients, usually wealthy Italian immigrants in business, industry or real estate who bought land for the construction of apartment buildings and shops for rental. These entrepreneurs liked architecture that optimized land use, and that was stylistically what some might consider ostentatious and extravagant. Perhaps his most important public work was the design of two pavilions (Public Celebrations and Postal Service) for the Exposición Internacional del Centenario (1910), for which he was awarded a Gold Medal.

Colombo embraced Eclectic Modernism, used by many Italian architects working in Buenos Aires at that time, and typified by elements of Medieval architecture, including the presence of round arches, windows and loggias, floral ornamentation and crenellated cornices. To these traditional features were added those inspired by Art Nouveau, and through exploring the possibilities offered by this combination, Colombo was able to evolve a very personal language. His work can be divided into two periods. The first extends up to 1920 and falls within the Italian school of Art Nouveau, as exemplified by the headquarters of the Unione Operai Italiani at 1374-82 Sarmiento, completed in 1913. At the end of this period, Colombo moved towards Classicism and Monumentalism, without renouncing Modernism, when he built Casa Grimoldi in 1918 at 2548-72 Corrientes Avenue for the businessman Grimoldi, owner of the shoe manufacturing company. In the second period, Colombo embraced Classical Eclecticism, and his designs became particularly self-confident and challenging.

Colombo completed close to 50 works in Buenos Aires in 21 years before his death at the age of 43. He died in Buenos Aires on 22 July 1927.

Today, Colombo is probably best remembered for La Casa de los Pavos Reales at 3216-36 Rivadavia and Casa Calise at 2562-78 H.Yrigoyen. Those of his Art Nouveau style buildings that still remain are easily recognized by their abundance of lion heads, balconies, iron work, cherubs, female heads and caryatids, turkeys, falcons and dragons.
