= Palandomus =

The Palandomus invented in 1919 by architect Mario Palanti, consists of a cement block of 18x18x36cm made with the vibration system, to serve as the cellular element of construction, being designed with a particular shape "hermaphrodite", which allows placement in any sense, without the constraints of location if not horizontal. In fact the thin ledge, ribs protrusion allow to leave the walls without plaster, but at the same time, ensure the maximum bonding of the elements. The Palandomus is sufficient to withstand up to safety limit of 70 meters in elevation, allowing, without special precautions, the installation of jack arch to openings doors and windows and of dry archivolt.

== Bibliography ==
- Mario Palanti, Architettura per tutti, editore E. Bestetti, 1946
- Eleonora Trivellin, Storia della tecnica edilizia in Italia: dall'unità ad oggi, Alinea editore, 2006
- Ramón Gutiérrez, Architettura e società: l'América Latina nel XX secolo, Jaca Book, 1996
- Virginia Bonicatto, “Reason, Economy and Technique”. The Palandomus Constructive System and its Ephemeral Application in Housing (December, 2018)

== See also ==
- Mario Palanti
