= Civico Mausoleo Palanti =

Coordinates: 45°29′11″N 9°10′45″E

The Edicola Palanti inside the Cimitero Monumentale di Milano, work by architect Mario Palanti built in 1924–28, become Civico Mausoleo to honorable citizens of Milan in on 4 February 1981. Famous graves inside are: Hermann Einstein, Walter Chiari, Giovanni D'Anzi, Virgilio Ferrari, Emilio Guicciardi, Paolo Grassi, Franco Russoli, Alfredo Bracchi, Maria Bonizzi, Girolamo Palazzina, Innocenzo Gasparini, Ciro Fontana, Fernanda Wittgens, Franco Parenti, Angelo Cucchi, Carlo Mariano Colombo, Luigi Berlusconi.

== Gallery ==
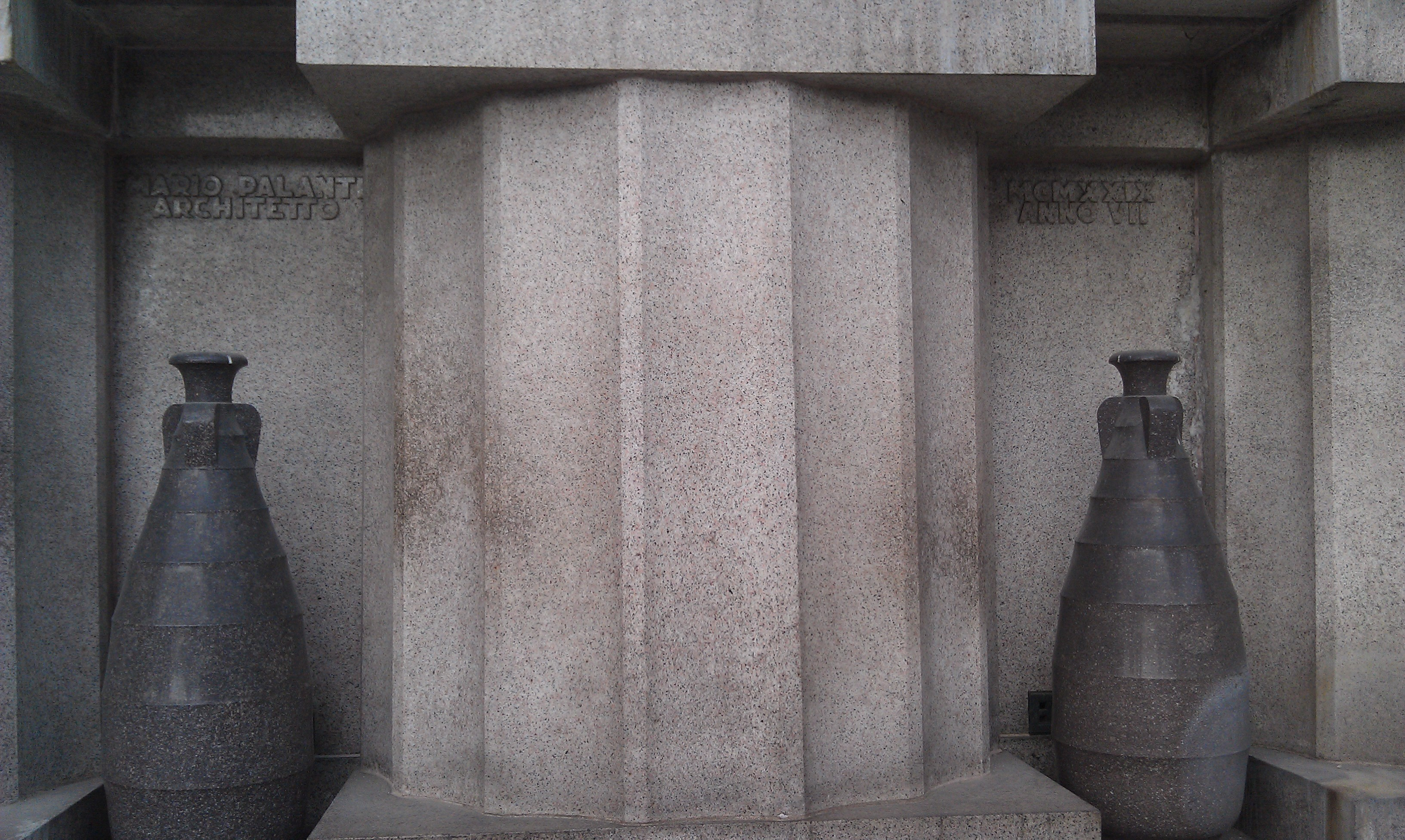
Mario Palanti, 1929

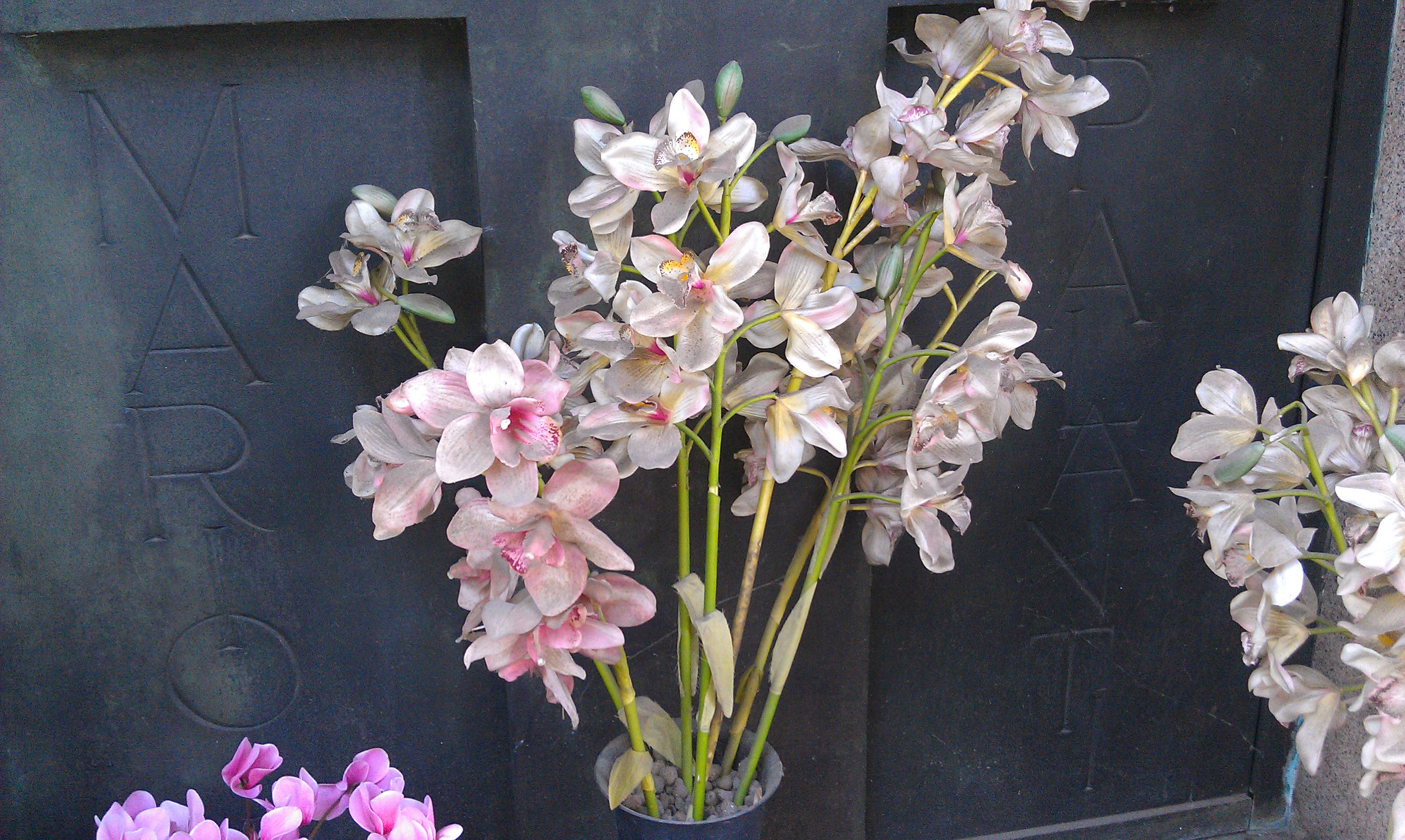
Access, particular

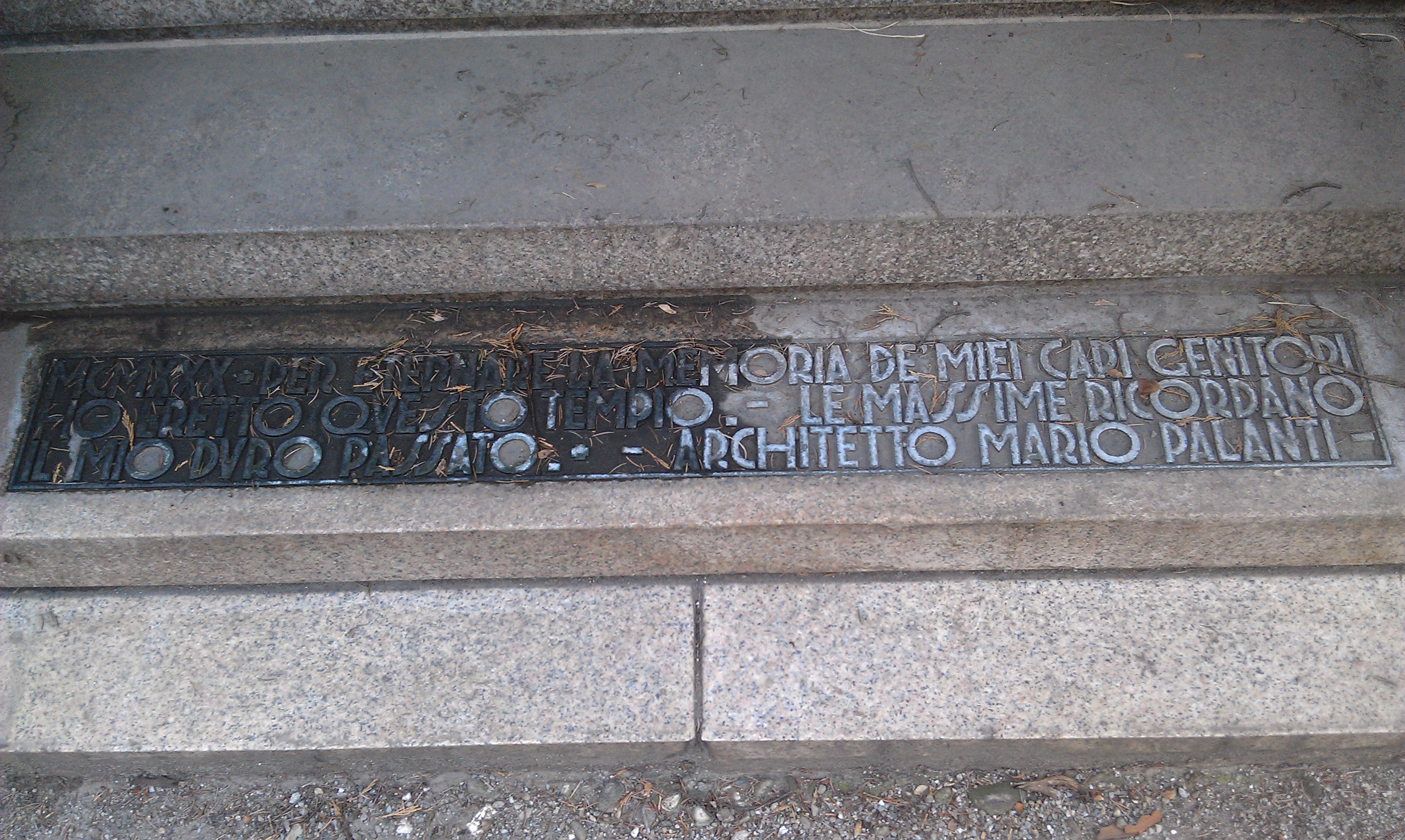
Soglia, Per eternare la memoria dei miei genitori ho eretto questo tempio - Le massime ricordano il mio duro passato, 1930

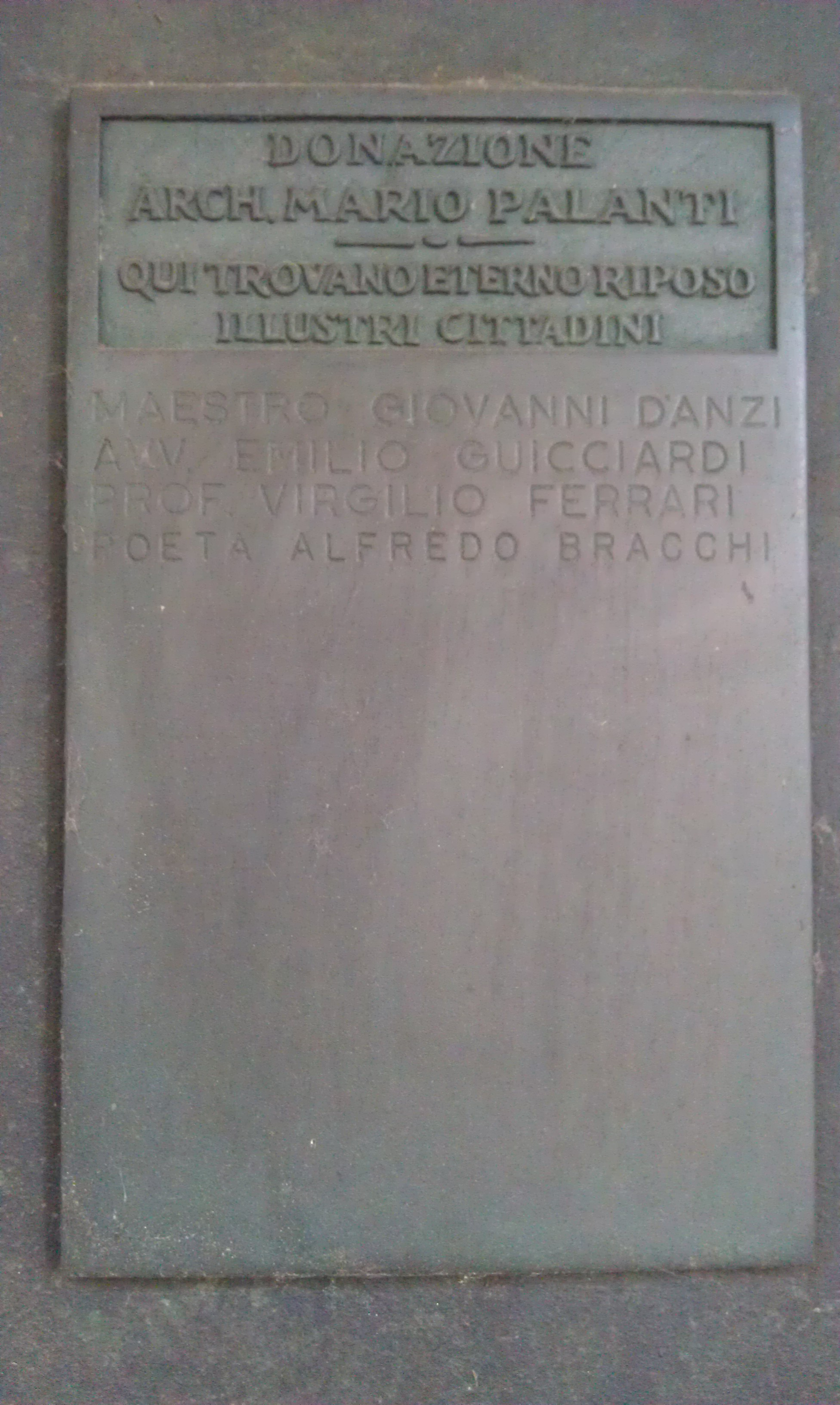
Donation frame

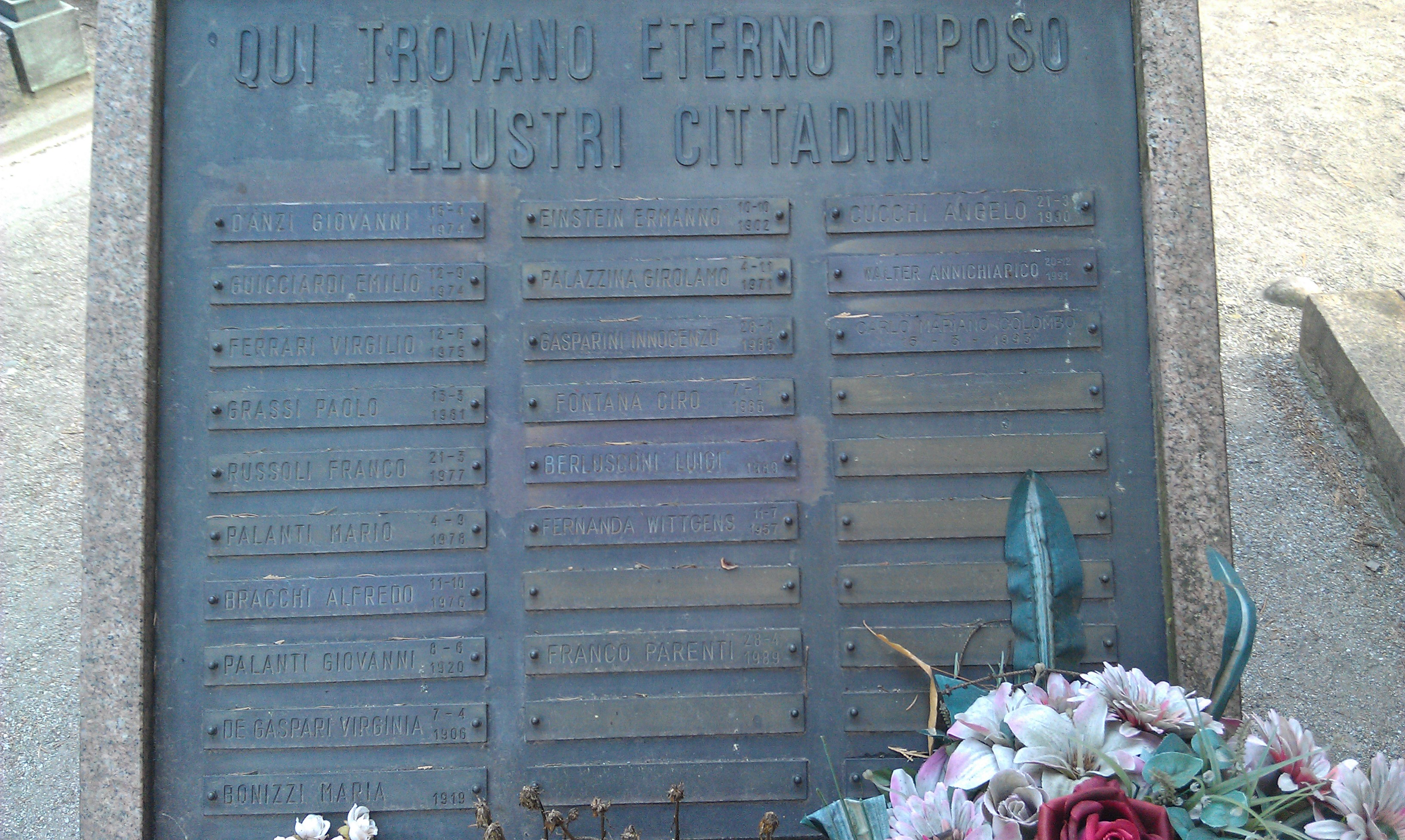
Honorable Citizens of Milano

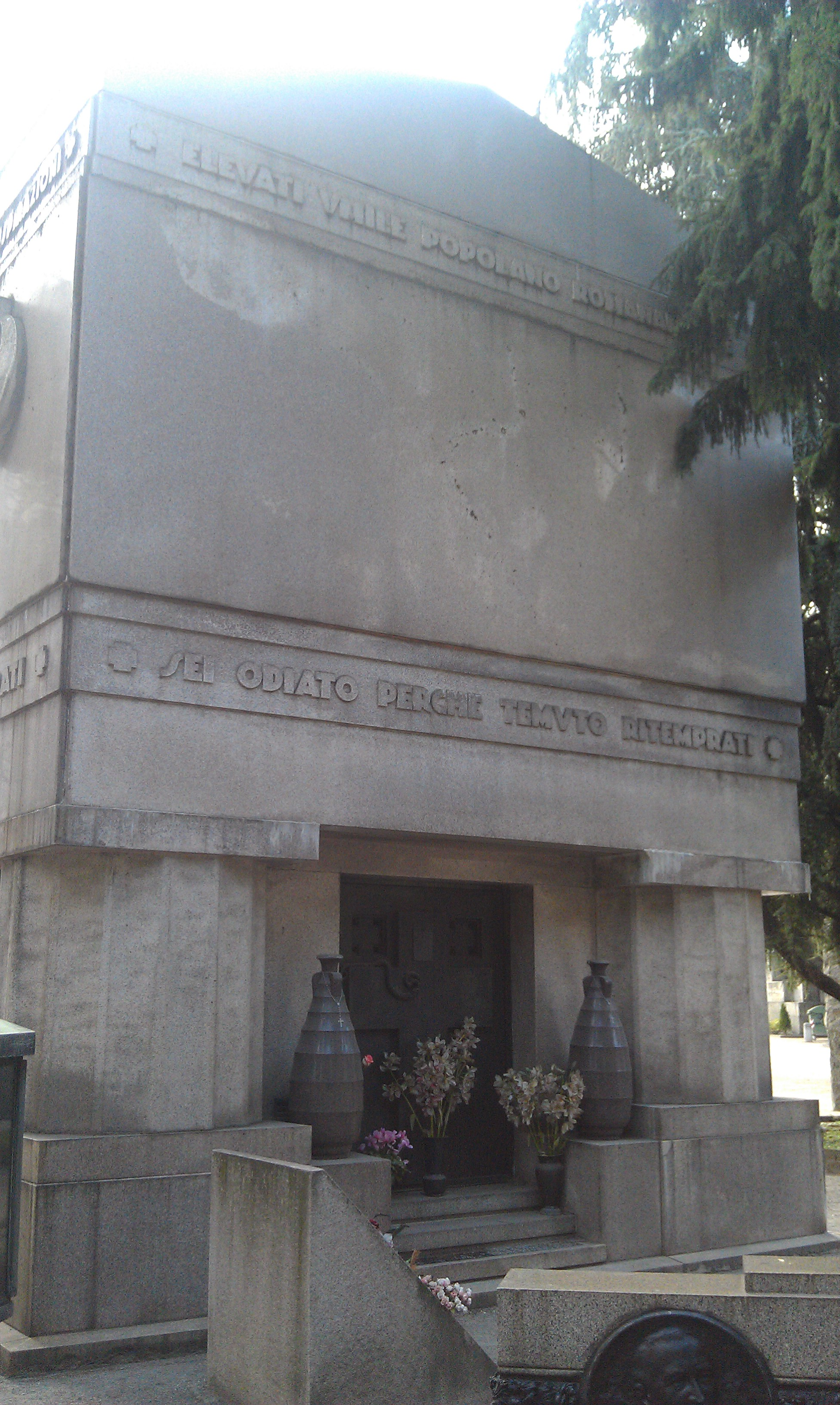
Massime front access

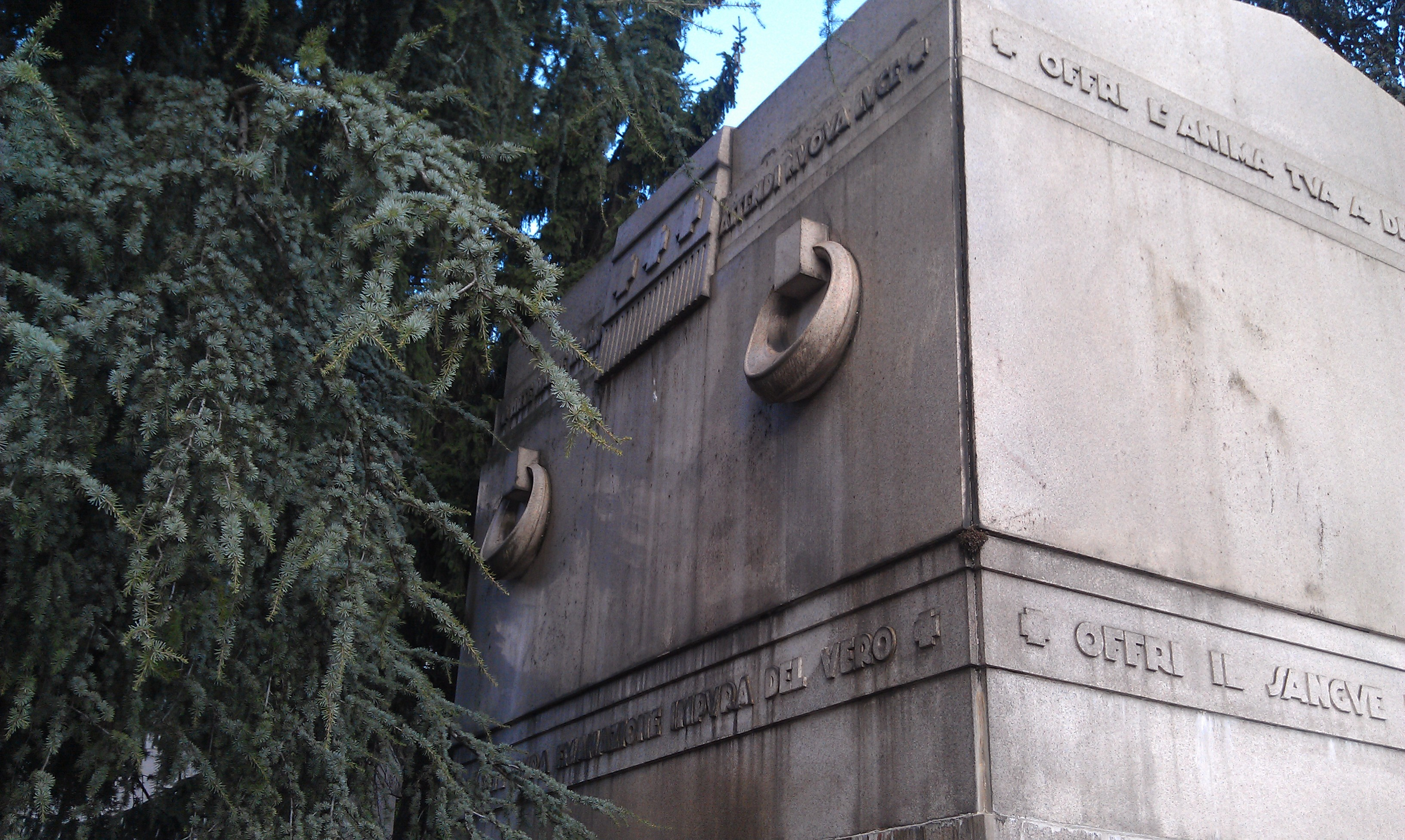
Massime right side

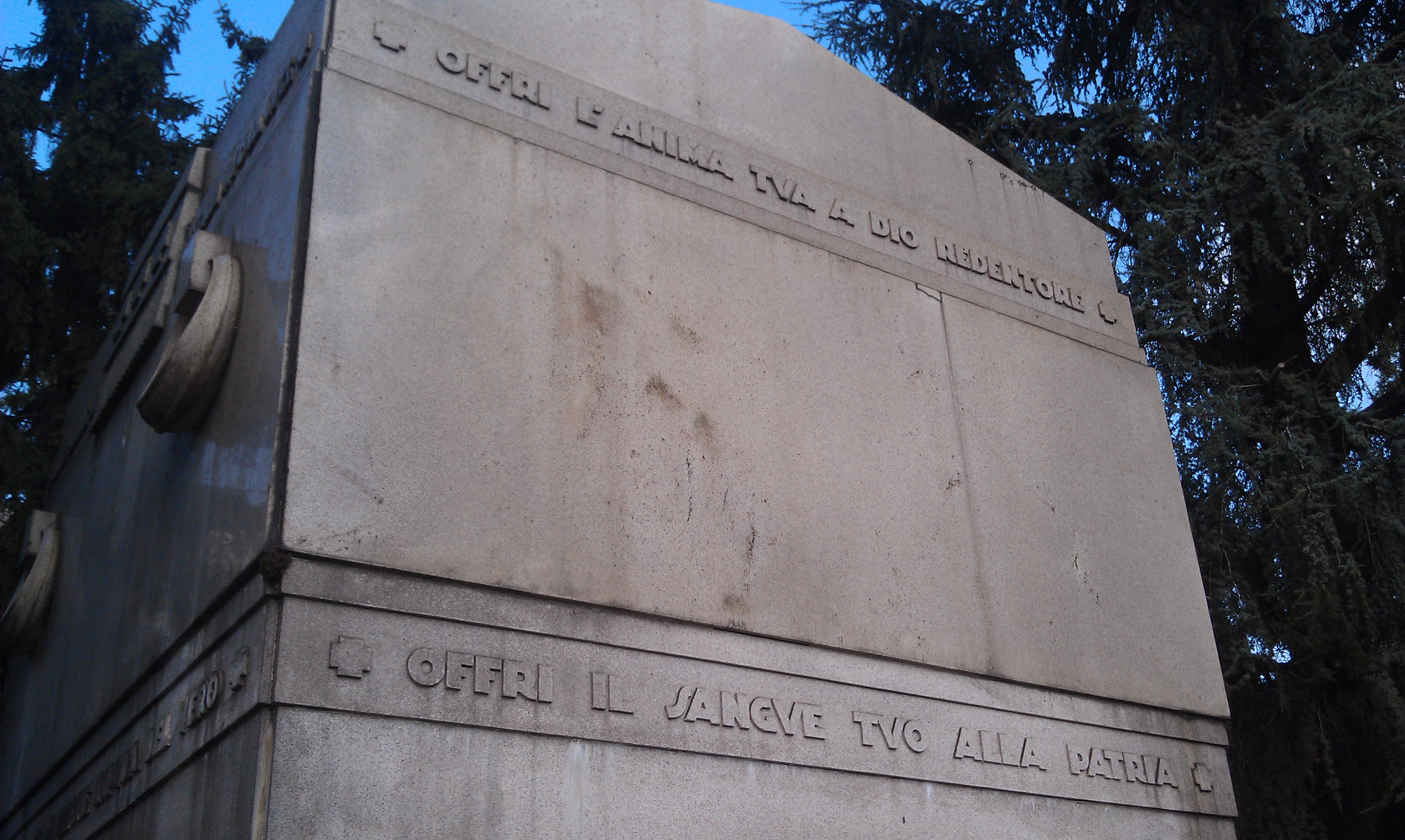
Massime rear side

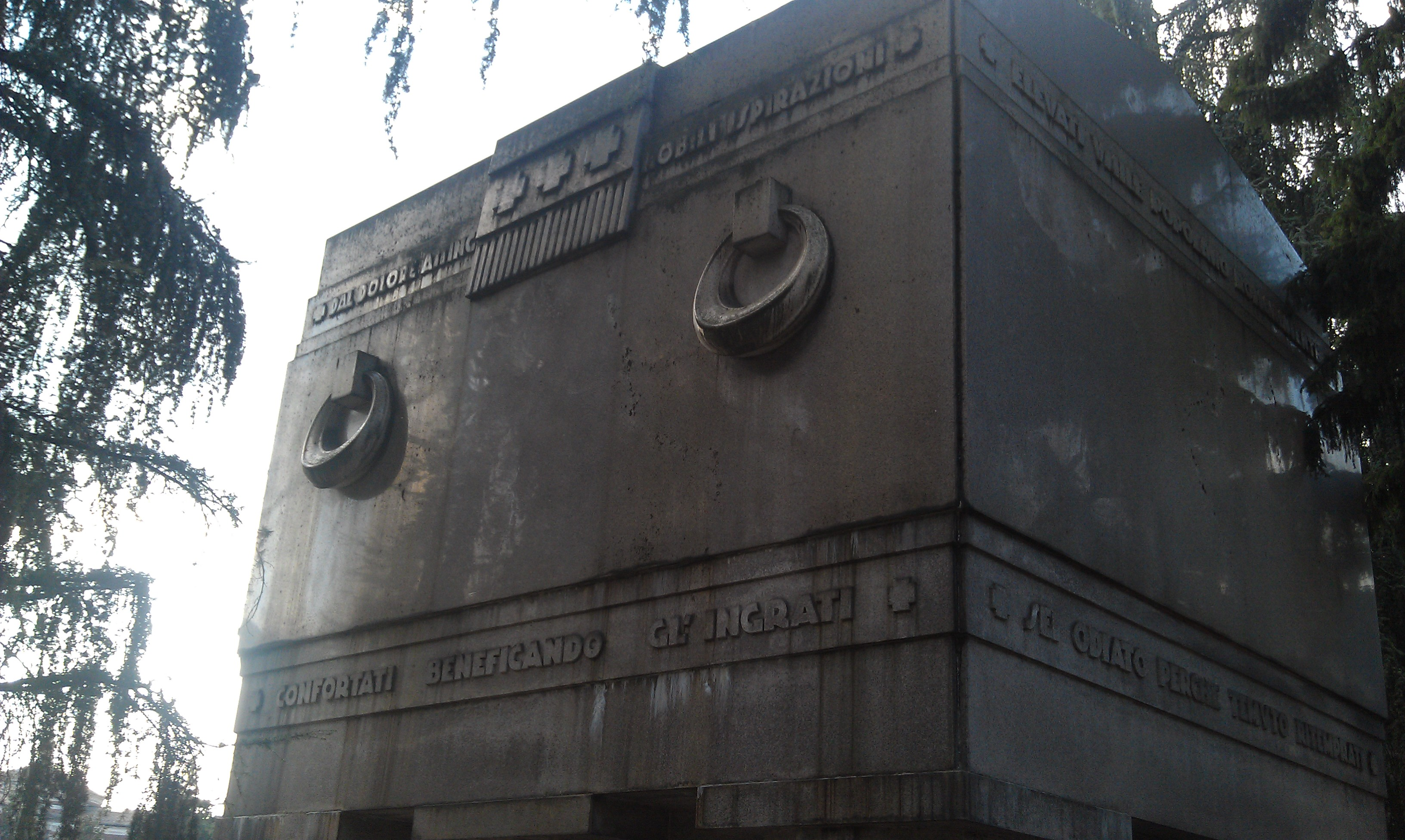
Massime left side

== Related links ==
- Mario Palanti
