= Palladio (disambiguation) =

Palladio is the name by which Italian architect Andrea Palladio (1508–1580) is commonly known.

Palladio may also refer to:

- Palladio (Jenkins), a piece for string orchestra by Karl Jenkins, recorded on his album Diamond Music
- Palladio (horse), participant in Equestrian at the 2004 Summer Olympics – Individual dressage
- Palladio (font), a font by URW similar to Palatino
- Sam Palladio (born 1986), English actor and musician
