= Altagamma =

Italian luxury brands association

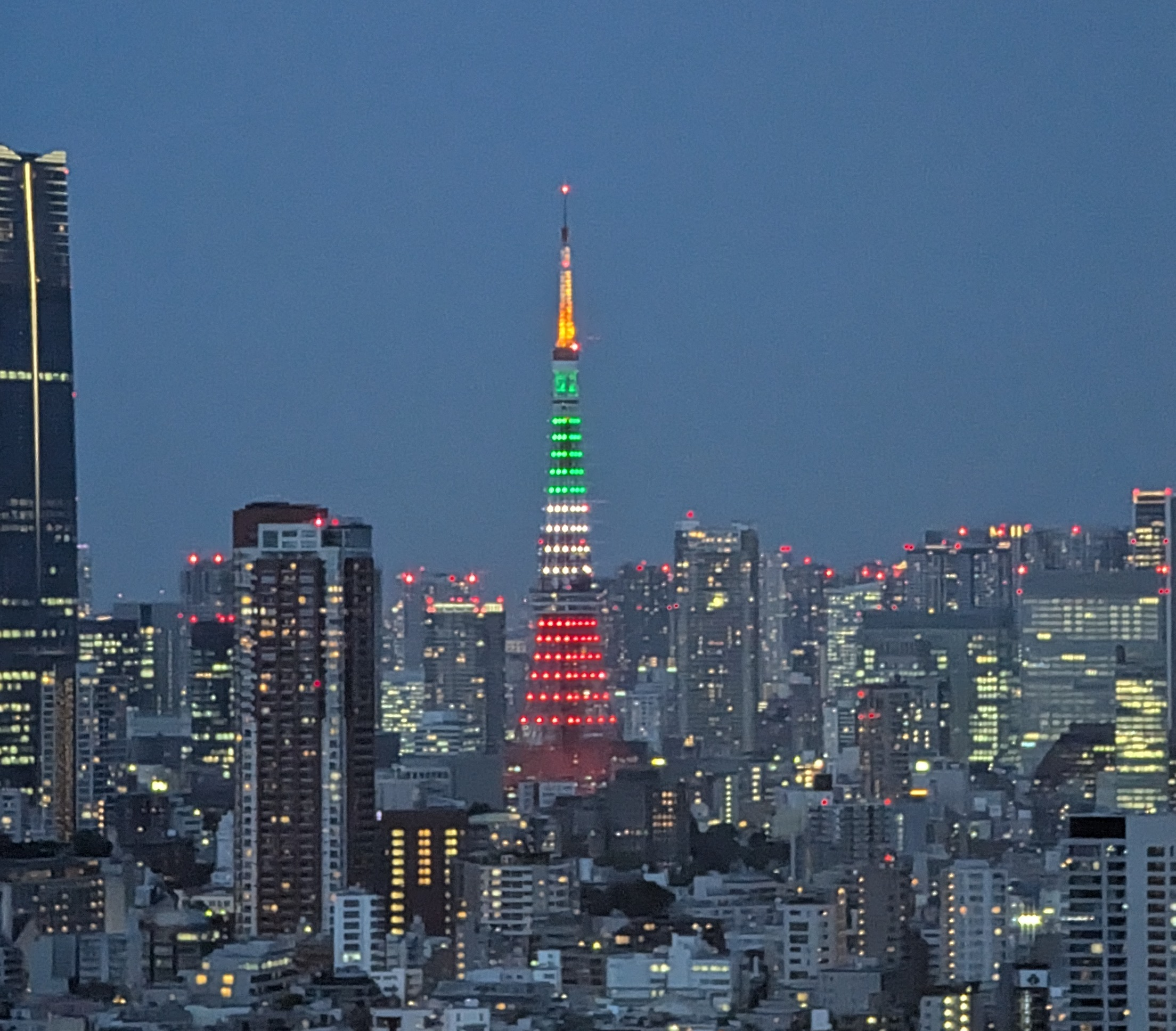
Tokyo Tower illumination for "Made in Italy day", sponsored in part by the Altagamma Foundation.

The Altagamma Foundation (Italian: Fondazione Altagamma) is an association of Italian luxury brands in the design, fashion, food and beverage, jewelry, automobile, and hospitality industries who are "recognized globally as authentic ambassadors of Italian style."

== History ==
The Altagamma Foundation was created in 1992 by Italian luxury brands including Alessi, Les Copains, Ferragamo, Ferré, Zegna and Versace.

In 2012, the Foundation finalized the financing for the transformation of the Galleria Vittorio Emanuele II.

In 2015, Altagamma launched the prize Premio Giovani Impresse to reward young luxury companies and offer them a one-year membership into the Foundation. The Foundation also launched a new cursus to develop luxury craftsmanship in Italy.

In December 2019, Matteo Lunelli, president of Ferrari Trento, was named president of Altagamma for the 2020-2022 period.

== Description ==
The Altagamma Foundation commissions global research studies on behalf of its members, with the goal to protect the luxury reputation of its members. It fulfills a similar function as the French Comité Colbert.

== Members ==
Altagamma member companies are:

- Acqua di Parma
- Riso Acquerello
- Agnona
- AGRIMONTANA
- Alberta Ferretti
- Alessi
- Alfa Romeo
- Alias
- Allegrini
- Artemide
- Aurora
- B&B Italia
- Baratti & Milano
- Bellavista
- Biondi Santi
- Bisazza
- Boffi
- Bottega Veneta
- Brioni
- Brunello Cucinelli
- Buccellati
- Bvlgari
- Ca' del Bosco
- Caffarel
- Corneliani (since 2015)
- Danese
- DOMORI
- Driade
- Dainese (since 2018)
- Ducati Motor Holding
- Emilio Pucci
- Ermenegildo Zegna
- Etro
- Fantini
- Fendi
- Ferrari
- Ferrari Trento
- Flos
- FontanaArte
- Frette
- Gucci
- Hotel Bauer Il Palazzo
- Hotel Bellevue Syrene
- Hotel Bvlgari Milano
- Hotel Capri Palace and SPA
- Hotel De Russie
- Hotel L'Albereta
- Hotel L'Andana
- Hotel Lungarno
- Hotel Masseria San Domenico
- Hotel Principe di Savoia
- Hotel Seven Stars Galleria
- Hotel Splendido
- Hotel Verdura Golf & Spa Resort
- Hotel Villa D'Este
- Illy Caffè
- Isaia
- Jil Sander (since 2024)
- Kartell
- Living Divani
- Loro Piana
- Luce della Vite
- Marni (since 2024)
- Masi Agricola
- Mastrojanni
- Max Mara
- Missoni
- Moleskine
- Moroso
- Nonino
- OGER
- Omas
- Ornellaia
- Persol
- Poltrona Frau
- Prada (since 2019)
- René Caovilla
- Riva
- Salvatore Ferragamo
- San Pellegrino
- Segnana
- Sergio Rossi
- Stone Island
- Technogym
- Tod's
- Valentino
- Venini
- Versace
- Vhernier
- Yoox (since 2014)
- Zanotta

== See also ==
- Made in Italy
- Italian fashion
- Milan Fashion Week
- Comité Colbert
- Henokiens
