= Fernanda Wittgens =

Italian art historian and art critic (1903–1957)

- Fernanda Wittgens In the 1920s
- Born: 3 April 1903; Milan, Kingdom of Italy
- Died: 11 July 1957 (aged 54); Milan, Italy
- Education: Academy of Sciences and Letters in Milan
- Occupation: Art historian

Fernanda Wittgens (3 April 1903 – 11 July 1957) was an Italian art historian and museologist. She was the first woman to direct a major museum in Italy. Appointed director of the Pinacoteca di Brera in 1940 and subsequently of the Lombardy Gallery in 1950, she organized rescue operations during World War II to protect the collections of several Milanese museums threatened by bombing and Nazi plunder, while also establishing an underground network to help persecuted Jewish families escape. Arrested in July 1944 and sentenced to four years in prison, she was released shortly before the Italian campaign (World War II). After the war, she oversaw the restoration of the Pinacoteca and spearheaded the "Grande Brera" project. She was posthumously recognized as Righteous Among the Nations in 2014.

== Background and education ==
Fernanda Wittgens was born on 3 April 1903, in Milan, into a cultured family of Austro-Hungarian descent. Her father, Adolfo Wittgens, was a literature teacher at the Parini high school in Milan, and her mother was Margherita Rigini. Adolfo used to take his children to visit the city's museums every Sunday.

After completing her classical secondary education, Fernanda Wittgens earned her degree in art history in 1925 from the Academy of Sciences and Letters in Milan, under the supervision of Professor Paolo D'Ancona, with a thesis titled: La Bibliothèque d'art italien au XXe siècle (The Library of Italian Art in the 20th Century). Subsequently, she taught art history at the Parini and Manzoni high schools in Milan, while also contributing to the newspaper L'Ambrosiano.

Fernanda Wittgens in 1950

In 1928, thanks to the intervention of Mario Salmi, then an inspector at the Pinacoteca di Brera, Fernanda Wittgens was hired as temporary staff at the museum, tasked with technical and administrative duties. Her skills impressed the director, Ettore Modigliani, who had been leading the Pinacotheca and overseeing galleries in Lombardy since 1908. In 1931, Modigliani appointed her as an assistant before promoting her to the position of deputy director. That same year, at the age of twenty-eight, she organized an exhibition of Italian art in London on behalf of the Pinacoteca. In 1933, she officially became an inspector at Pinacoteca di Brera. When Ettore Modigliani was dismissed from his post in 1935 due to his anti-fascist views and imprisoned in L'Aquila, Wittgens continued her work while keeping him informed about the affairs of the Pinacoteca di Brera. After the enactment of the Italian racial laws in 1938, which targeted Modigliani because of his Jewish culture and led to his dismissal from the civil service in 1939, Wittgens maintained intellectual ties with him.

== World War II ==
As soon as Italy entered the war, Wittgens organized the evacuation of artworks from Brera to safe locations. In the absence of a central authority responsible for protecting cultural heritage following the armistice of September 1943, she took charge of protecting the Pinacoteca's collections as well as those of the Museo Poldi Pezzoli and the Quadreria dell'Ospedale Maggiore to prevent them from being looted or transferred to Germany.

She moved the artworks to secure storage sites, working with a reduced staff and makeshift transport. The transfer of paintings continued until June 1943. On 7 and 8 August 1943, Allied bombing raids destroyed twenty-four of the Pinacoteca's thirty-six rooms, but they were empty. The Brera collections were perfectly preserved; among the saved works were Mantegna's Dead Christ Supported by Angels, Piero della Francesca's San Bernardino Altarpiece (Lotto), Raphael's Marriage of the Virgin, and Caravaggio's Road to Emmaus appearance.

== Aid to persecuted and arrested Jews ==
Alongside her work preserving artistic heritage, Wittgens organized the escape to Switzerland of relatives, friends, and other Jews to protect them from Nazi persecution. Among those she helped were her former teacher, Paolo Dancona, and his family.

In July 1944, she was denounced by a young German Jew whose emigration she had facilitated. She was arrested at dawn on 14 July 1944, tried by a special tribunal, and sentenced to four years in prison. The press of the time dubbed the case the ladies' trial (il processo delle signore), as Wittgens was tried alongside Adele Capelli, Zina Tresoldi, and Mariarosa Tresoldi, who were also involved in aiding Jews and anti-fascists.

She was initially imprisoned in Como, then transferred to San Vittore prison in Milan; she was released in February 1945 thanks to a forged medical certificate—provided by her family attesting that she was suffering from tuberculosis. She was transferred to a clinic in Milan, where she remained until her liberation.

In a letter to her mother from San Vittore prison, dated 13 September 1944, she wrote:

"It would be far too convenient to be an intellectual in peacetime only to show cowardice or even mere neutrality, when danger strikes. The truth is that this stems from a deep-seated conviction, a reflection of my entire way of life: I cannot act otherwise, for I possess a mind that thinks this way and a heart that feels things in this manner."

After the Liberation, Wittgens resumed her duties at Brera. Alongside Ettore Modigliani, who had returned from internment, she developed the Grande Brera project: a museum linked to Milan's artistic institutions, the Brera Academy, the Observatory, and the Biblioteca di Brera and conceived as a space serving the city. Modigliani died in 1947, but Wittgens carried on their shared vision.

The architectural reconstruction of the Pinacoteca was entrusted to the architect Piero Portaluppi. The museum reopened its doors on 9 June 1950. Wittgens organized cultural events, concerts, exhibition openings, and fashion shows there.

== Superintendent of Galleries for Lombardy ==
In 1950, Wittgens was appointed Superintendent of Galleries for Lombardy. In this capacity, she contributed to the reconstruction of the La Scala Theatre Museum and the Poldi Pezzoli Museum. Acquisition of the Pietà Rondanini.

In 1952, the Municipality of Milan acquired Michelangelo's Pietà Rondanini, a sculpture that was highly sought after by Rome, Florence, and the United States at the time. Restoration of Leonardo da Vinci's The Last Supper.

In the early 1950s, Wittgens decided to undertake the restoration of Leonardo da Vinci's *The Last Supper*—which had been damaged during the war—and entrusted the task to restorer Mauro Pelliccioli. The mural was reopened to the public on 30 May 1954.

== The 1953 Picasso controversy ==
In 1953, Wittgens found herself competing with Palma Bucarelli, director of the Galleria Nazionale d'Arte Moderna, to organize the first major Picasso exhibition in Italy. The two women, both heirs to the legacy of Margherita Sarfatti, championed opposing aesthetic views: Wittgens advocated a purist vision of art, whereas Bucarelli focused on contemporary creation. The exhibition was held first in Rome and then in Milan in 1953. Correspondence between the two museums and Pablo Picasso is preserved in the archives of the Picasso Museum in Paris.

== Death ==
Fernanda Wittgens died in Milan on 11 July 1957, at the age of fifty-four.

== Honors and award ==
- 1949: Gold Medal of the Municipality of Milan
- 1954: Gold Medal of the President of the Italian Republic
- 17 April 1955: Gold Medal of the Union of Italian Jewish Communities, for her assistance to persecuted Jews. 1956: Officer of the Order of Merit of the Italian Republic.
- 2014: Posthumous recognition as Righteous Among the Nations; a tree was planted in her honor, and a commemorative stele was erected in the Garden of the Righteous in Milan. Tributes and legacy.

=== Place names ===
A street in the central San Lorenzo district of Milan bears her name. Caffè Fernanda.

In 2018, Caffè Fernanda opened in the former entrance hall of the Pinacoteca di Brera, showcasing the Pesco Fiorito marble flooring and Rosso Levanto marble surrounds preserved from the original décor designed by Portaluppi in the 1950s. The café was named in honor of Wittgens.

=== Exhibition and biography (2018) ===
In 2018, at the initiative of the *Amici di Brera* (Friends of Brera) association, an exhibition and a book titled Sono Fernanda Wittgens. Una vita per Brera curated by art historian Giovanna Ginex, were released by Skira. This book represents the first comprehensive scholarly biography dedicated to Wittgens.

== In media ==
Television movie *Fernanda* (2023): On 31 January 2023, the RAI 1 channel broadcast the television movie Fernanda, co-produced by Rai Fiction and Red Film and directed by Maurizio Zaccaro. Matilde Gioli played the title role. The film's broadcast coincided with Yom HaShoah in Italy. Essay by Rachele Ferrario (2024).

In 2024, art historian Rachele Ferrario, a professor at the Brera Academy, published La contesa su Picasso. Fernanda Wittgens e Palma Bucarelli (La Tartaruga); this essay chronicles the rivalry between the two directors regarding the 1953 Picasso exhibition.
