= Bust of Girolamo Benivieni =

Terracotta portrait bust by Giovanni Bastianini (1863–1864)

- Artist: Giovanni Bastianini
- Year: 1863–1864
- Medium: Terracotta
- Dimensions: 53.8 cm × 54 cm × 32.5 cm (21.2 in × 21 in × 12.8 in)
- Location: Louvre, Paris
- Accession: RF 119

The Bust of Girolamo Benivieni (Italian: Busto di Girolamo Benivieni) is a terracotta sculpture by Giovanni Bastianini, purportedly depicting the Florentine poet Girolamo Benivieni. The actual sitter was Giuseppe Bonaiuti, a seventy-year-old worker at a tobacco factory in Florence who was acquainted with the sculptor.

Initially regarded as an authentic Renaissance sculpture, the bust was in fact made in 1863–1864 for the antiquarian Giovanni Freppa. It subsequently passed through several hands before entering the Louvre. When its modern origin came to light in 1867, it sparked an intense debate among contemporary art critics and historians, becoming one of the best-known examples of nineteenth-century artistic forgery.

== History ==
=== Commission and first sale (1863–1864) ===
Girolamo Benivieni, portrayed here by Ridolfo Ghirlandaio and subsequently reproduced by Allegrini in his Serie di ritratti, was one of the likely inspirations for the bust.

The Bust of Girolamo Benivieni was sculpted in late 1863 or in 1864, on commission from Giovanni Freppa, a prominent antiquarian active in Florence whose dealings often occupied the narrow boundary between legality and fraud. Recognising Bastianini's abilities, Freppa had placed the sculptor under contract as early as 1848.

Soon after its completion, the bust attracted the attention of Alessandro Foresi, a Florentine art collector who recognised Bastianini's handiwork and offered 500 francs for it, an amount then considered appropriate for a sculpture in the Neo-Renaissance style. In 1864 Freppa displayed the work at the Leon Bianco hotel, where it caught the eye of the collector and art dealer Louis Félix, Viscount de Nolivos; according to another account, it was first noticed by a man named Rivet, who subsequently told de Nolivos about the terracotta bust during a meeting in Milan. In November that year, de Nolivos purchased it for 700 francs and took it to Paris, having agreed with Freppa to share any profits from a subsequent sale in the French capital.

=== Exhibition in Paris and critical attributions (1865–1868) ===
In 1865, the bust was publicly exhibited for the first time at the Exposition rétrospective held at the Palais de l'Industrie in Paris, where it received an enthusiastic response from critics. Writing in the Gazette des Beaux-Arts, Paul Mantz called it the “pearl of the exhibition” and dated it to the late fifteenth or early sixteenth century, suggesting that it was probably the work of an unidentified sculptor from the school of Andrea del Verrocchio. This was not the first time one of Bastianini's works had been attributed to Verrocchio: a relief depicting the Holy Family had previously been mistaken for a work by the Renaissance master and subsequently purchased by a French dealer.

Verrocchio and his pupils were not the only artists to whom the bust was attributed. Art historians also proposed Donatello, Desiderio da Settignano, Mino da Fiesole, Antonio Rossellino and Benedetto da Maiano, although the principal candidate became Lorenzo di Credi. This attribution gained particular support because, although di Credi was principally known as a painter, he had also worked as a sculptor. Moreover, Giorgio Vasari had mentioned a portrait of Benivieni by the Florentine artist, believed to have been lost, which could plausibly have been identified with the bust in de Nolivos's collection.

The work also attracted international attention. As late as 1868, the German journal Zeitschrift für bildende Kunst, reporting through its Paris correspondent, still described it as an authentic Renaissance sculpture, praising its workmanship and reproducing the image previously published in the Gazette des Beaux-Arts.

=== The de Nolivos auction and acquisition by the Louvre (1866) ===
In January 1866, the de Nolivos collection was offered for sale at the Hôtel Drouot. A fierce bidding contest for the bust developed between Henri de Triqueti, attending on behalf of Henri d'Orléans, Duke of Aumale, and Émilien de Nieuwerkerke, then superintendent of the Paris museums. Nieuwerkerke secured the sculpture for 13,200 francs, a sum which rose to 14,000 francs including additional expenses. Although de Nolivos and Freppa had agreed to divide the proceeds equally, Freppa received only 1,000 francs. The purchase price was exceptional for the period: by comparison, the Venus de Milo, acquired in 1820, had cost only 6,000 francs. This illustrated the high value attached to Renaissance art in France.

Following the purchase, the bust was placed in the Louvre gallery devoted to Italian sculpture, in a prominent position alongside the Nymph of Fontainebleau by Benvenuto Cellini and Michelangelo's Dying Slave. The Louvre records the formal acquisition date as 8 January 1867.

=== Bastianini's claim of authorship and Freppa's defence (1867) ===
Wood engraving depicting Giovanni Bastianini, sculptor of the bust of Benivieni.

The fame attained by the bust, together with the fact that it had been sold for a sum vastly exceeding the 300 lire Bastianini had received for making it, surprised and angered the sculptor. He began to assert his authorship, only to be accused of fraudulently claiming credit for an authentic fifteenth-century work of art. Freppa came to his defence. Although their collaboration had ended by mutual agreement in 1866, the dealer publicly supported his former associate. On 15 December 1867, La Chronique des arts et de la curiosité published a letter from Freppa describing how and when he had commissioned the bust from Bastianini. Freppa maintained that de Nolivos had purchased the work as it stood and that no one involved in the transaction had ever specified the date on which the portrait of Benivieni had been made.

Around this time, a rumour began circulating in Paris, fuelled in part by resentment of Nieuwerkerke's influential position, that he had originally purchased the bust for his private collection and, after discovering that it was a forgery, had attempted to conceal his mistake by reselling it to the French government. Whether true or not, the allegation continued to circulate for years, repeated by acquaintances of Bastianini and Freppa. Among them was Alessandro Foresi, who wrote in the preface to an 1869 book that French law prohibited public officials responsible for a museum such as the Louvre from acquiring works of art for their private collections, a pointed criticism directed at Nieuwerkerke.

Freppa and Bastianini also assembled numerous testimonies intended to establish the sculptor's authorship beyond doubt. One came from Luigi Romanelli, the manager of the factory where Bastianini had purchased the clay used to model the bust and where he had subsequently had it fired. Others were provided by Francesco Gajarini, Curzio Fioravanti, Giuseppe Santoni, Enrico Bacci, Lorenzo Fattori, Raffaello Colzi, Carlo Minoccheri and Vincenzo Rastrelli, a varied group of artists and workers acquainted with Freppa and Bastianini. They declared that they knew with certainty that the bust had been sculpted by the artist from Fiesole and that its model was Giuseppe Bonaiuti, nicknamed “il Priore” (“the Prior”).

Caricature of Giovanni Freppa, drawn by Emilio Lapi in 1857 for the satirical magazine Il passatempo.

A further statement was signed by twenty-six of Bonaiuti's colleagues at the cigar factory, who declared that they recognised him as the person portrayed in the bust. At Bastianini's request, these declarations were subsequently certified by the management of the tobacco manufactory, which confirmed that all the signatories were indeed its employees and also affirmed that Bonaiuti was the sitter.

The controversy also reached the French imperial court. During a visit to Florence in March 1867, Prince Napoléon Bonaparte asked a local antiquarian whether it was true that the bust had been modelled on a worker at the tobacco factory, and received confirmation. Around the same time, Princess Mathilde Bonaparte, a close friend of Count de Nieuwerkerke, took an interest in the affair and brought it to the attention of Emperor Napoleon III. The emperor reportedly remarked that, if the bust was genuinely a work of artistic merit, there was no reason to remove it from the Louvre.

=== The French controversy and Italian responses (1867–1868) ===
Freppa's article and the extensive documentation produced in support of Bastianini's claim caused a sensation in French artistic circles. The Louvre's management, however, dismissed the Italian dealer's allegations as motivated by resentment at having sold cheaply a work that had subsequently fetched twenty times as much at auction. The institution maintained that the article in La Chronique was merely a conspiracy devised by Freppa and his associates to discredit a genuine antique by passing it off as a forgery.

Title page of Alessandro Foresi's Tour de Babel, ou Objets d'art faux pris pour vrais et vice versa (1868), one of the publications central to the dispute between Italian and French intellectuals over the bust's authorship.

An article signed “E. C.” and published in Le Nord on 29 December 1867 attacked Bastianini particularly fiercely. It challenged him to create another work of equal quality, claiming that up to 15,000 francs would be offered for it if he succeeded. It also accused him of opportunistically involving Bonaiuti in the affair, since the worker had died in 1864. This last circumstance was confirmed by documents from the Hospital of Santa Maria Nuova recording Bonaiuti's death on 20 July that year. Bastianini soon responded in Il Diritto, reiterating that he had made the bust and denying any part in a fraud: after receiving his payment from Freppa, he said, he had played no role in the terracotta's subsequent sales. He turned the accusation of dishonesty back on his critics, maintaining that any wrongdoing should be sought in Paris rather than Florence.

The French sculptor Eugène-Louis Lequesne also intervened in the dispute. In a letter to the editor of La Patrie, which was subsequently published, he argued that the resemblance between Bonaiuti and the person represented in the bust might be coincidental. He further claimed, on technical grounds, that the clay used and the method of execution were inconsistent with the work having been produced in his own time.

Bastianini again responded promptly. In a letter dated 26 February 1868 and printed in the Gazzetta di Firenze on 16 March, the sculptor answered Lequesne's objections point by point. To the observation that he had left a fingerprint on the bust, he replied that all sculptures were made by hand. To doubts concerning the quality of the clay, he responded by offering to send a sample of the material he used so that it could be examined.

In 1868, Alessandro Foresi, a friend of Bastianini, published an account of the scandal entitled Tour de Babel, ou Objets d'art faux pris pour vrais et vice versa. In response, Jules Charvet published L'âne qui prend la peau du lion, fourberie florentine à quatre personnages.

=== Epilogue (1868) ===
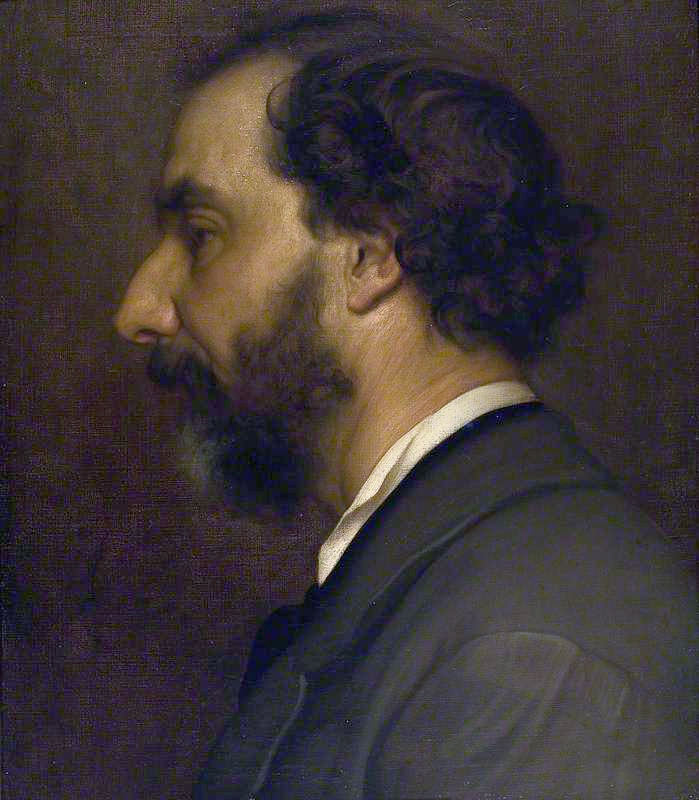
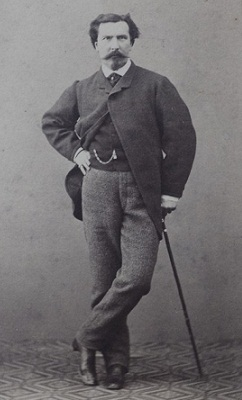
Giovanni Costa and Cristiano Banti, purchasers of a bust of Girolamo Savonarola whose authorship they subsequently acknowledged as Giovanni Bastianini's.

Although the public enjoyed following the dispute over the bust of Benivieni, the affair had become so prominent that the Louvre could no longer ignore it. Count de Nieuwerkerke, who remained convinced of the work's authenticity, privately declared that he was prepared to pay Bastianini 15,000 francs if the Italian sculptor could produce another work of equal merit. On learning of this, Bastianini announced through the newspaper La Nazione that he was ready to accept the challenge. Not only could he produce a bust comparable to the Benivieni for 3,000 francs, he said, but with the money left over he could also model busts of the Twelve Caesars.

No reply ever came from the count. Bastianini had meanwhile rebuked him for failing to act as Cristiano Banti and Giovanni Costa had done when they discovered that a bust of Girolamo Savonarola they had purchased as a fifteenth-century work had in fact been made by Bastianini: the two men immediately acknowledged his authorship in the newspapers. On 29 June 1868, Bastianini died suddenly. The Benivieni bust was then quietly removed from the Louvre's Renaissance gallery and placed in a cupboard in the room housing the Sauvageot collection.

Bastianini's death allowed the affair to subside and gradually pass out of public attention. Despite the controversy and the sculptor's sudden death—he had appeared to be in good health and had continued working until only a few days earlier—no investigation was opened. It is possible that allowing the dispute to fade away was considered the preferable course, partly for diplomatic reasons connected with relations between Italy and France.

== The bust in the nineteenth-century Italian art market ==
The Bust of Girolamo Benivieni and the controversy surrounding the discovery of its modern origin belong to a period when Italy had become one of the principal destinations for European art collectors and enthusiasts. This development had roots in the Grand Tour, which spread during the eighteenth century, generating substantial demand for Italian works of art and laying the foundations for the nineteenth-century art market.

In the nineteenth century, the expansion of museums increased demand for works of high artistic value, or “high art”, while the simultaneous growth of tourism stimulated demand for more affordable decorative objects for private homes and residences. Renaissance art in particular enjoyed renewed popularity and became the most sought-after sector of international collecting. Rising demand prompted the art market to expand beyond Rome, the traditional centre of the Grand Tour, into the rest of Italy. This fostered a dense network of workshops, antique shops and studios managed by an increasing number of specialists, advisers and art connoisseurs.

The sometimes questionable practices of art dealers were no secret in Italy, as illustrated by this 1858 caricature from Piovano Arlotto. Giovanni Freppa and two fellow antiquarians are depicted satirically alongside their characteristic wares, in Freppa's case maiolica.

This flourishing art trade coincided with the Risorgimento, when the newly unified Italian state prioritised cataloguing and protecting existing artworks rather than regulating a rapidly expanding market, which was also populated by copies and forgeries.

Within this context emerged a commercial system geared towards meeting the emotional and material expectations of an international clientele, in which the boundary between legitimately satisfying demand and outright fraud became exceptionally narrow. The Benivieni affair exemplified the cultural tensions between Italian dealers and foreign purchasers. The former often assumed that their customers understood the implicit conventions governing certain transactions, whereas the latter were scandalised by the prospect of deception in a market which, regardless of a forger's intentions, was driven by seemingly insatiable foreign demand for Italian art.

The case of Bastianini's bust had political as well as social significance. In the nineteenth century, possession of Renaissance artworks had become a symbol of French cultural hegemony and the imperial power of Napoleon III. In Italy, by contrast, the appropriation of its artistic heritage was perceived as a national humiliation, heightened by the Louvre's acquisition of the Giampietro Campana collection in 1862. Bastianini's work can be understood in this context as an effort to recapture the spirit of the Renaissance within the nineteenth-century cultural climate of the Risorgimento. His busts and reliefs, conceived as sophisticated pastiches, did not merely imitate fifteenth-century originals but reinterpreted them through contemporary tastes and sensibilities.

The episode involving Cristiano Banti and Giovanni Costa was also revealing. When the two collectors discovered that a bust of Girolamo Savonarola, which they had bought as a fifteenth-century work, had actually been modelled by Bastianini, they did not react with anger. Instead, they declared themselves pleased to learn that such a gifted artist was their contemporary. Their response stood in sharp contrast to the French reaction, where the revelation concerning the Benivieni bust had sparked a dispute involving not only connoisseurs and dealers but also the two nations, Italy and France.

== Description ==
Drawing of the Bust of Girolamo Benivieni published in the Gazette des Beaux-Arts.

The work is a terracotta bust depicting a man with strongly defined, masculine features, whose face and forehead give the impression that he is lost in thought. It greatly impressed the art critic Paul Mantz, who saw it exhibited in 1865 and described a man past the age of fifty, wearing old-fashioned clothing and a small fifteenth-century cap resembling the one worn by Sandro Botticelli in Filippino Lippi's fresco in the Brancacci Chapel at Santa Maria del Carmine, Florence. Mantz characterised the bust as bearing the mark of a remarkably vivid personality and declared that, although he had never known Benivieni, he could almost swear that the portrait resembled him.

To model the bust, Bastianini drew on the appearance of his acquaintance Giuseppe Bonaiuti, a tobacco-factory worker, an image on an old coin, and, according to Giovanni Freppa, Benivieni's portrait reproduced in Giuseppe Allegrini's Serie di ritratti d'uomini illustri toscani con gli elogj istorici dei medesimi. According to Riccardo Nobili, the original intention may simply have been to portray Bonaiuti. Only afterwards, Nobili suggested, did an observer notice the sitter's resemblance to Girolamo Benivieni and persuade Bastianini to inscribe the work with the words “HIERMUS BENIVIENI”. Not all art historians agree, however, that the inscription on the back of the bust was made by Bastianini himself. Anita Fiderer Moskowitz argues that the roughly cut letters are inconsistent with the sculptor's demonstrated lettering skills in other works, which were considerably more accomplished than those visible on the reverse of the Benivieni bust.

== Bibliography ==
=== Books ===
- Treves, Emilio; Strafforello, Gustavo (1878). Dizionario universale di geografia, storia e biografia (in Italian). Milan: Fratelli Treves Editori.
- Becker, Robert (1889). Die Benivieni-Büste des Giovanni Bastianini. Zur Geschichte der Fälschungen (in German). Breslau: Wilhelm Koebner.
- Moskowitz, Anita Fiderer (2013). Forging Authenticity: Bastianini and the Neo-Renaissance in Nineteenth-Century Florence. Florence: Leo S. Olschki. ISBN 9788822261717.
- Scalia, Fiorenza; De Benedictis, Cristina, eds. (1984). Il Museo Bardini a Firenze (in Italian). Milan: Electa. ISBN 884351105X.
- Brunori, Dioniso (1906). Giovanni Bastianini e Paolo Ricci, scultori fiesolani: cenni biografici con illustrazioni (in Italian). Florence: Tipografia Domenicana.
- Nobili, Riccardo (1922). The Gentle Art of Faking. London: Seeley Service.
- Foresi, Raffaello (1868). Giovanni Bastianini da Fiesole scultore (in Italian). Civelli.
- Foresi, Alessandro (1868). Tour de Babel, ou Objets d'art faux pris pour vrais et vice versa (in French). Paris: P. Lauriel.
- Foresi, Alessandro (1869). Sulle Porcellane Medicee: Lettera al Barone di Monville e poche parole riguardanti gli scultori Conte di Nieuwerkerke e Giovanni Bastianini (in Italian). Florence: Tipografia all'Insegna di S. Antonino.
- Schüller, Sepp (1960). Forgers, Dealers, Experts: Strange Chapters in the History of Art (PDF). New York: G. P. Putnam's Sons.

=== Newspapers and periodicals ===
- Claretie, Jules (4 January 1868). "Le buste de Benivieni". L'Illustration: Journal universel (in French).
- Foresi, Mario (August 1919). "Lo scultore Giovanni Bastianini e della sorte prodigiosa delle opere sue". Emporium (in Italian). L (296): 90–102.
- La Chronique des arts et de la curiosité, no. 203 (1867), p. 299. Digitised edition (in French).
- "Korrespondenz aus Paris". Zeitschrift für bildende Kunst (in German). 3. E. A. Seemann: 118–124. 1868.
- Mantz, Paul (1865). "Le buste de Benivieni". Gazette des Beaux-Arts (in French). 19: 336–340. doi:10.11588/diglit.18741.
- Recami, Francesco (16 July 2022). "Di vero c'è solo la morte – Bastianini, il falsario scultore" (PDF). Il Fatto Quotidiano (in Italian). Archived from the original (PDF) on 20 April 2025.

=== Academic publications ===
- Helstosky, Carol (2009). "Giovanni Bastianini, Art Forgery, and the Market in Nineteenth-Century Italy". The Journal of Modern History. 81: 793–823. doi:10.1086/605486.
- Moskowitz, Anita Fiderer (2019). "Giovanni Freppa, 'Jack of All Trades'". Journal of Modern Italian Studies. 24 (4): 551–578. doi:10.1080/1354571X.2019.1646039.
- Öcal, Tina (2018). "Shape-shifters of Transculturation: Giovanni Bastianini's Forgeries as Embodiment of an Aesthetic Patriotism". Faking, Forging, Counterfeiting: Discredited Practices at the Margins of Mimesis. Bielefeld: Transcript Publishing. pp. 111–126. doi:10.14361/9783839437629-007.
