= Dead Christ Supported by Angels =

Painting by Giovanni Bellini in the City Museum of Rimini

Pietà
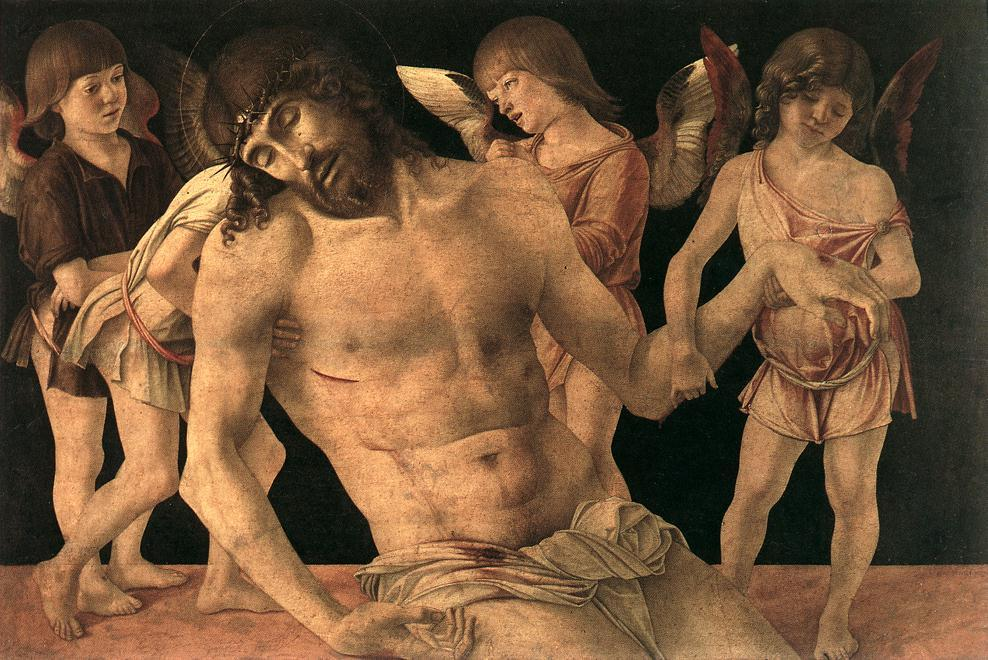
- Artist: Giovanni Bellini
- Year: c. 1470
- Medium: tempera on panel
- Dimensions: 80.5 cm × 120 cm (31.7 in × 47 in)
- Location: Museo della Città, Rimini

Pietà or Dead Christ Supported by Angels or Dead Christ Supported by Four Angels is a painting in tempera on panel by the Italian Renaissance artist Giovanni Bellini, now in the city museum of Rimini. It is dated to around 1470, making it one of his early mature works, around the same time as another Pietà of his in the Pinacoteca di Brera).

After having undergone a comprehensive conservation treatment by the Venetian Heritage, the painting was on view in Venice at the Galleria Giorgio Franchetti alla Ca' d'Oro from November 21, 2025, to January 6, 2026, and in the United States (for the first time) at the Morgan Library & Museum in Manhattan from January 15 through April 19, 2026.

== See also ==
- List of works by Giovanni Bellini

== Bibliography ==
- (in Italian) Mariolina Olivari, Giovanni Bellini, in AA.VV., Pittori del Rinascimento, Scala, Firenze 2007. ISBN 888117099X
- Giovanni Bellini's Pietà Restored by Venetian Heritage (2025) Marsilio Arte. ISBN 9791254633441. Accompanies the Morgan Library & Museum exhibit
