= Doxis Bekris =

Greek chef

Evdoxios "Doxis" Bekris, (Greek: Δόξης Μπεκρής) born 30 July 1975 in Rhodes, Greece is a Greek chef, restaurateur, F&B consultant, author and culinary arts lecturer. He has launched and operated a number of renowned restaurants in Greece and around the world. Bekris was responsible for the F&B and Culinary operations of 34 Swissotel properties worldwide. He was chosen by Lufthansa as guest chef in their Star Chef Program and over 150 of his own menu creations were served on all of Lufthansa's inbound and outbound GCC flights.

== Personal life ==
Doxis Bekris was born and raised on Rhodes island in southern Greece.

== Culinary training ==
Bekris started his education at High School of Krestena, Peloponnese in 1990. He left the school at the age of 16 and completed his studies at the Technical Professional School of Tourism in Rhodes in 1993. Later he received a degree in Food Hygiene at Stamford College, UK Bekris also holds an HND in Hospitality and Licensed Retail Management from the University of Wolverhampton, UK. Later, he also attended a fast track training program for chefs in The Culinary Institute of America (CIA) in Napa, California. While at CIA he was invited to perform as a presenter and guest chef at the annual event World Of Flavors.

== Career ==
Bekris’ first job was as a junior chef in a large hotel complex Esperides Resort in Rhodes, Greece he worked as a junior sous chef at a 3 Michelin Star Restaurant at Hotel L'Albereta, member of Altagamma. After this he moved back to Greece where he worked as an executive chef at various resorts. In 2004 he becomes the executive chef of a newly opened venue Residence Georgio Hotel in Athens.

In 2005 Bekris moved to Dubai, UAE to join the 5-star Kempinski Hotel Mall of Emirates as an executive chef where he worked for 2 years. In June 2007 Bekris was promoted to become a regional executive chef for Middle East and Africa of Kempinski Hotel S.A., being responsible for all of the hotel chain's pre-openings in the UAE, Djibouti, Bahrain, Lebanon, Morocco, Jordan and Egypt. In 2008 he became executive chef at The Address Downtown Dubai Hotel.

In November 2014 Bekris moved to Africa to lead the overall culinary operation of 3 luxury hotels of FRHI Hotels & Resorts group in Kenya. In 2016 he was recruited by the Raffles hotel in Dubai.

== Television ==
In 2013 Bekris was invited as a celebrity guest chef to star at one of the episodes of Master Chef 2 Greece TV Show
