= Bastianini =

Bastianini is an Italian surname. Notable people with the surname include:

- Enea Bastianini (born 1997), Italian Grand Prix motorcycle racer
- Ettore Bastianini (1922–1967), Italian opera singer
- Giovanni Bastianini (1830–1868), Italian sculptor
- Giuseppe Bastianini (1899–1961), Italian politician and diplomat
- Guido Bastianini (1945–2025), Italian papyrologist and palaeographer
- Pablo Bastianini (born 1982), Argentine footballer
