= Allegrini =

Allegrini is a surname. Notable people with the surname include:

- Agnese Allegrini (born 1982), Italian badminton player
- Francesco Allegrini da Gubbio (1587–1663), Italian painter
- Giacinto Allegrini (born 1989), Italian football player
- Giuseppe Allegrini, Italian printer and engraver
- Laura Allegrini (born 1960), Italian politician
- Maria Allegrini, Italian physicist
