= Venetian Heritage =

Nonprofit focused on Venetian art and culture

- Formation: 1999
- Founder: Lawrence D. Lovett
- Headquarters: Venice and New York
- Presidents: Peter Marino (Venetian Heritage Inc., USA) Valentina Marini Clarelli Nasi (Fondazione Venetian Heritage Onlus, Italy)
- Director (Venice): Toto Bergamo Rossi
- Website: https://www.venetianheritage.eu/

Venetian Heritage is a non-profit organization based in Venice and New York focused on the promotion and preservation of the art of Venice and architecture of Venice and the former Republic of Venice.

Venetian Heritage has partnered with local and international corporations and hosts fundraising galas to finance its restoration projects, exhibitions, and publications. It often collaborates with the Italian Ministry of Culture and other nonprofits with similar aims. Venetian Heritage is also part of the executive committee of the International Private Committees for the Safeguarding of Venice, a consortium of nonprofits and countries dedicated to the conservation of Venice. Venetian Heritage has funded over 70 restoration projects.

== Fundraising events and partnerships ==
Venetian Heritage hosts the Venetian Heritage Biennale Gala Weekend for its members, which coincides with the opening of the Venice Biennale, to raise funds for its projects. Since its inception, the gala has been sponsored by Vhernier and Bulgari, and since 2019 Venetian Heritage has partnered with French fashion house Dior. The 2019 Tiepolo Ball at Palazzo Labia, the 2022 Opera Ball at the Fenice and the 2024 Naumachia Ball at the Arsenale have contributed to its restoration projects, most notably the Ca d'Oro Museum. During the 2023 Biennale of Architecture, Venetian Heritage collaborated with wine producer Ca' del Bosco to host a sculpture prize and fundraising event.

In 2023, Venetian Heritage and Direzione Regionale Musei Veneto of the Italian Ministry of Culture organized the exhibition Ca' d'Oro: Masterpieces of the Renaissance in Venice at the Al Thani Collection at Hôtel de la Marine in Paris, showcasing pieces from the Ca' d'Oro.

For the 2024 TEFAF, The European Fine Art Foundation invited Venetian Heritage and the Italian Ministry of Culture as an institutional guest to exhibit and promote their renovation of the Galleria Giorgio Franchetti at the Ca d'Oro.

== History ==
=== Founding (1999) ===
Venetian Heritage was founded in 1999 by Lawrence D. Lovett, an American businessman and philanthropist who was interested in Venice and its arts, with Khalil Rizk as its first president. After the devastating floods of 1966, worldwide attention was brought to the urgent need to protect and restore the historical architecture and art of Venice and the former Venetian Republic. Lovett sought to attract American interest and investment and organized fund-raising events in Venice and New York to sponsor restoration projects. With the help of Maria Teresa Rubin de Cervin Albrizzi, Lesa Marcello Alverà, and current director Toto Bergamo Rossi, Venetian Heritage was founded, with the aim of "safeguarding and promoting of the entire immense cultural heritage of the ancient Republic." The immediate focus for Venetian Heritage was the former Venetian Republic, with exploratory visits to Dalmatia. One of their first projects was the extensive restoration work in the 13th century Cathedral of Saint Lawrence in Trogir, Croatia, with funding provided in part by the Getty Foundation. Venetian Heritage was awarded the Europa Nostra conservation award for this project in 2003.

=== Expansion (2002 to 2014) ===
As Venetian Heritage expanded and received more European funding, a Venice-based branch, Fondazione Venetian Heritage Onlus, was founded. While projects continued abroad, such as the restoration of the 15th-century Chapel of Saint Anastasius at the Cathedral of Saint Domnius in Split in 2003, work expanded rapidly in Venice. In the 2010s Venetian Heritage also diversified from being a predominantly fundraising organization to making more direct interventions through exhibitions and publications in partnership with large corporations. For example, Venetian Heritage collaborated in 2010 with Louis Vuitton to restore the 14th-century gilt-silver altarpiece of the Church of San Salvador. From October 2010 to February 2011, the completed work was exhibited at the Bode Museum in Berlin.

A notable project from this period involved the Venetian Ghetto (widely considered the oldest in the world) in 2013, in advance of its 500th anniversary. Venetian Heritage restored many of the synagogue’s liturgical treasures in the Jewish Museum of Venice's collection. It also organized the traveling exhibition Treasures of Venice's Ghetto restored by Venetian Heritage with the support of Vhernier which stopped at Sotheby’s in New York, the Museum of Fine Arts in Houston, the Ca d'Oro in Venice, the Belvedere Museum in Vienna and the Art Gallery of Western Australia in Perth.

=== Further expansion: Museum work and International Exhibitions (form 2014) ===
Since 2015 Venetian Heritage began to expand the scope of its work and focuses not just on individual restoration projects but to works together with the state museums of Venice: the Gallerie dell’Accademia, Museo di Palazzo Grimani and the Ca' d'Oro. The first of such projects was with the Gallerie dell'Accademia. In 2015, Venetian Heritage partnered with Samsung to fund the Ministry of Culture's expansion of the museum, creating the Samsung and Venetian Heritage Wing, featuring interactive digital learning experiences. Further renovation of the Gallerie dell’Accademia took place in 2021, with Venetian Heritage also sponsoring the renovation and hangings of the Saloni Selva-Lazzari, which now holds several works of Venetian painters such as Tiepolo, Régnier, and Giordano. Venetian Heritage has also restored several paintings at the Gallerie including Gianantonio Guardi's c.1750-1755 Erminia e Vafrino scoprono Tancredi ferito and is projected to start work on the restoration of Bellini's San Giobbe altarpiece in 2024. The Gallerie dell'Accademia is often used to showcase the work of Venetian Heritage such as the restoration of L'indovina (The Fortune-teller) by Giovanni Battista Piazzetta in 2018.

Another key project was the late 15th-century Giorgio Vasari ceiling, composed of nine painted wood panels, originally in the Palazzo Corner Spinelli. The panels were separated and sold off into private hands in the early 19th century. Seven were eventually reacquired by the state. After several fundraising events, one in partnership with the American film director James Ivory, Venetian Heritage was able to purchase and restore the two missing panels in 2013 and 2016.

In 2017, Venetian Heritage secured the support of Bulgari to fund the restoration of two Veronese paintings, Saint Jerome of the Desert, and Saint Agatha in Prison, at the Church of San Pietro Martire, which had faded and oxidized due to neglect. The newly restored paintings were displayed at the Gallerie dell'Accademia then traveled as the Veronese in Murano: Two Venetian Renaissance Masterpieces Restored exhibition to the Frick Collection in New York and the New Orleans Museum of Art.

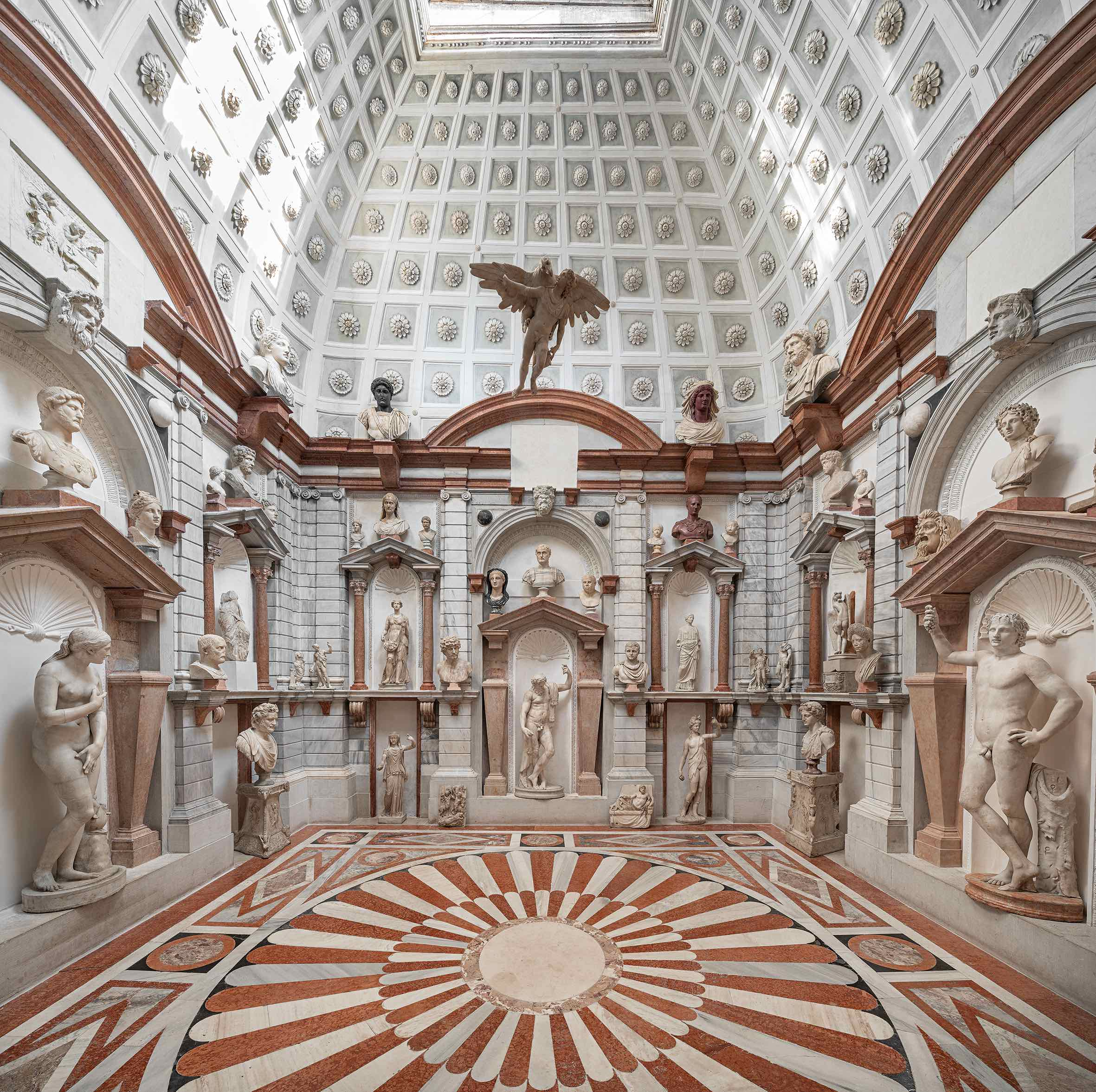
The Tribuna at Palazzo Grimani featuring the returned sculptures.

The restoration of Antonio Rizzo's 1472 statues of Mars, Adam and Eve at the Doge's Palace was completed in 2019 thanks to Venetian Heritage, with funding coming from its New York president, Peter Marino. The restoration workshop in the palace was open to the public to showcase about the restorative process carried out by experts in collaboration with the University of Padua.

The museum of Palazzo Grimani has also undergone substantial renovations and hosted several exhibitions due to the work of Venetian Heritage. For one of their most well-known exhibitions Domus Grimani 1594-2019 Venetian Heritage was able to bring together the sculptures originally collected by the Venetian patriarch Giovanni Grimani and displayed in the Roman-inspired Tribuna Grimani room and the Sala del Doge. The restoration and renovation of the main floor was also completed in 2021, and hosted an exhibition of neo-expressionist artist George Baselitz, who made custom paintings for the vacant stucco frames. In 2023, Venetian Heritage displayed their restored bust of Filippo Parodi Ecce Homo at Palazzo Grimani and are currently hosting the exhibition Tintoretto and Giovanni Grimani there.

=== Ongoing projects ===
To promote the preservation of Venetian art across Europe, Venetian Heritage partnered with the Museum of Fine Arts in Budapest to help fund the restoration of two sculptures by Josse Le Court of Minerva and Saturnus.

Venetian Heritage's ongoing project to renovate the Galleria Giorgio Franchetti at the Ca' d'Oro is its largest to date, having raised €8.5 million in funds thus far. Having already completed the new lighting system for the façade of the 15th-century Venetian gothic palace in 2023, the project will see the museum restyled and modernized from its 1970s design.
