= Fantini =

Fantini is an Italian surname. Notable people with the surname include:

- Ascensidonio Spacca (ca. 1557 – 1646), known as Fantini, Italian painter
- Akira Fantini (born 1998), Japanese footballer
- Alessandro Fantini (1932–1961), Italian cyclist
- Corrado Fantini (born 1967), Italian shot putter
- Enrico Fantini (born 1976), Italian footballer
- Marco Fantini (born 1965), Italian artist
- Nicholas Fantini (born 1984), real name of Italian rapper Egreen
