= Cristiano Banti =

Italian painter (1824–1904)

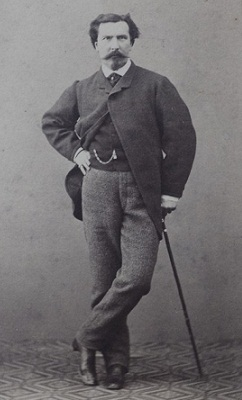
Cristiano Banti (c.1860) Photograph by Fratelli Alinari

Cristiano Banti (4 January 1824 – 4 December 1904) was an Italian genre and landscape painter. He was a leading figure in the Macchiaioli movement of Tuscany.

== Biography ==
Banti was born into a middle-class family in Santa Croce sull'Arno. A scholarship enabled him to study at the Accademia di belle arti di Siena with Francesco Nenci. At this time, he worked in the Neo-Classical style and produced what is perhaps his best-known work, Galileo Facing the Inquisition.

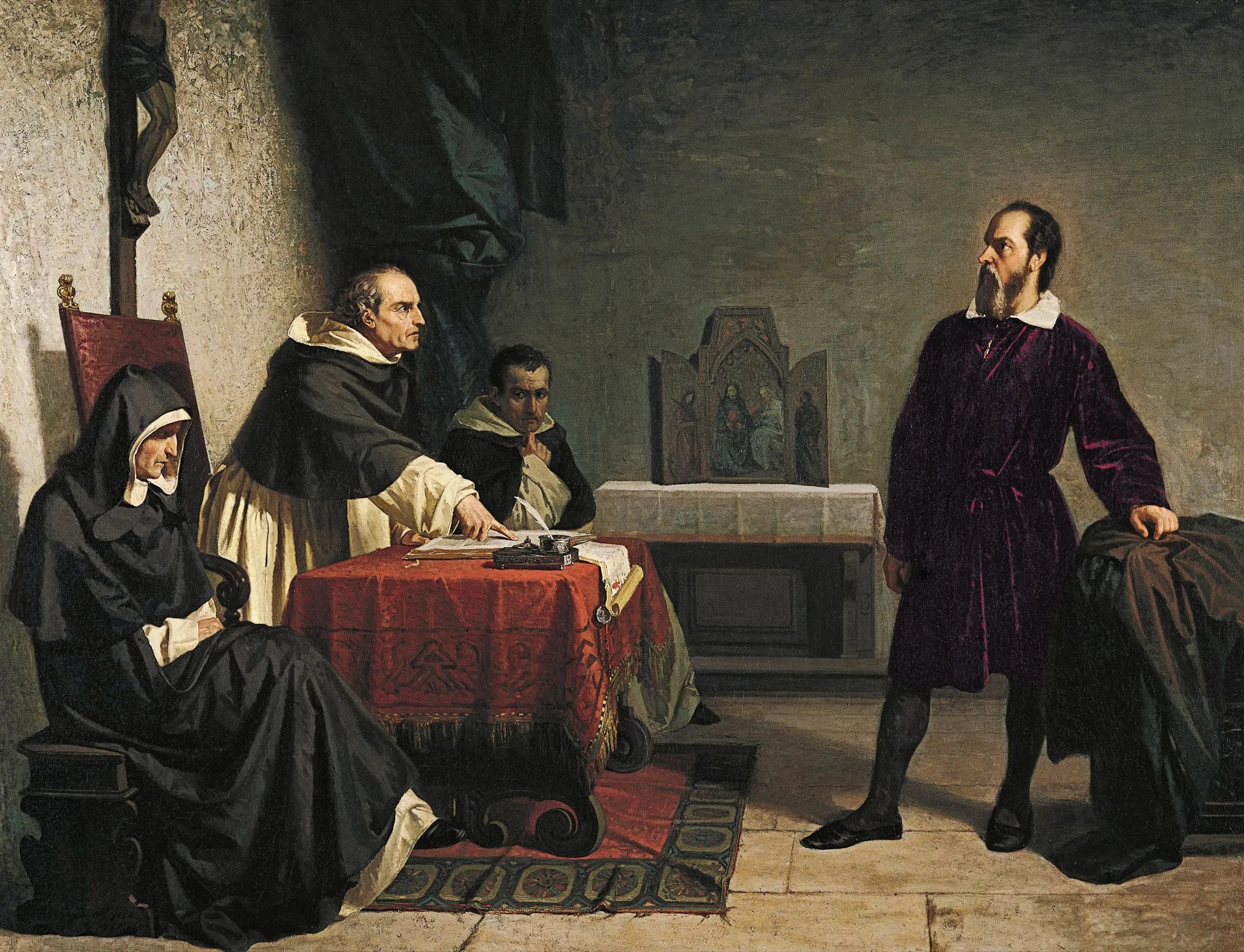
Galileo Facing the Inquisition, 1857

In 1854, he moved to Florence and became an habitué of the Caffè Michelangiolo, an important meeting place for local artists. It was here that he had his introduction to the Macchiaioli movement. His conversion to the movement's aesthetic ideals was such that he sought to have "Galileo" removed from display because he had "dishonored art without knowing it".

After that, he became determined to produce paintings that would capture the natural effect of sunlight, going on many long outdoor excursions with his associates; especially Telemaco Signorini, who had a great influence on him.

In 1861, he went to Paris to study with Constant Troyon and Camille Corot, then settled in Castelfranco di Sopra to continue his nature studies. Perpetually dissatisfied with his work, he rarely exhibited. In 1870, he was part of the jury at the "Esposizione Nazionale di Parma" and had a falling out with Signorini. Five years later he returned to Paris, then went to London in 1879 to familiarize himself with English art.

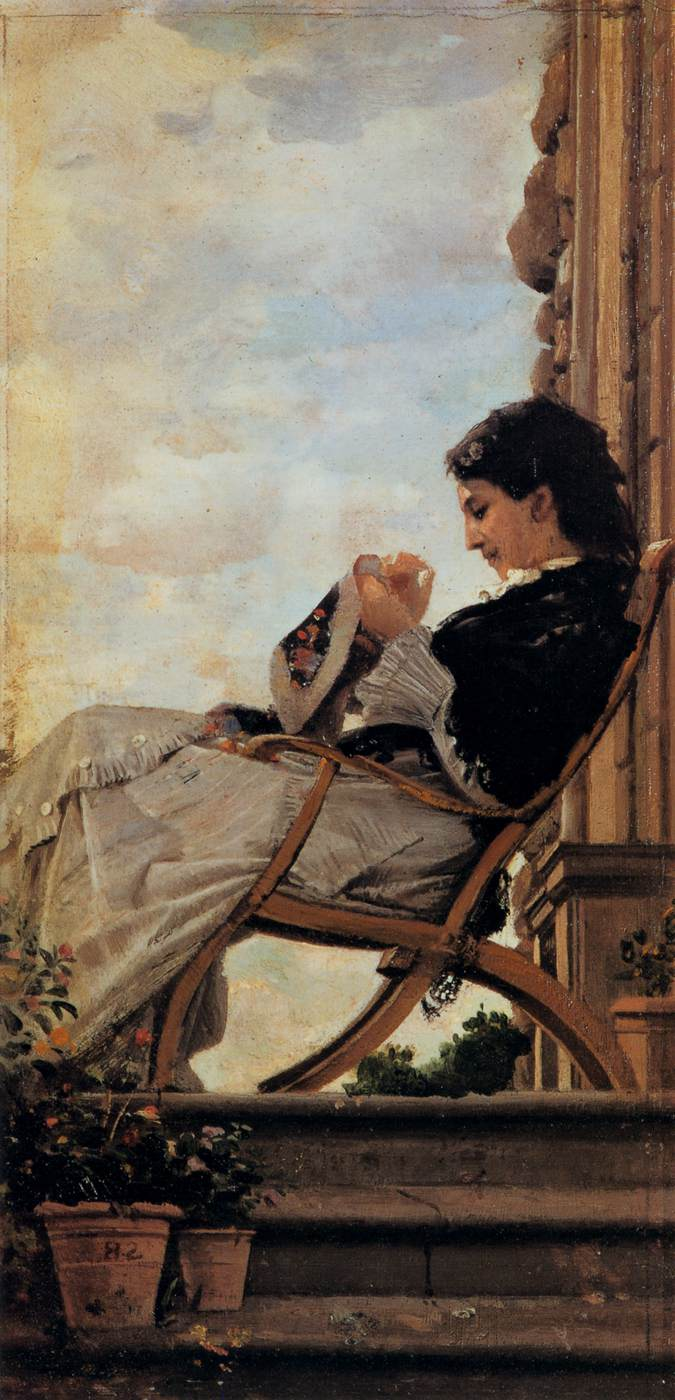
Woman Sewing on the Terrace, 1882

Divisions between him and the other Macchiaioli became deeper and he was often criticized, so he retired to his family's villa near Castelfiorentino. Following the death of his wife, he moved to Montemurlo, where he spent most of his time collecting art—often from the Macchiaioli, with whom he had become largely reconciled. Occasionally, he would even provide them with a place to stay.

Although still shy of public recognition, he accepted an appointment as Professor at the Academy of Fine Arts and served on the commission charged with reorganizing the Uffizi. In 1887, he was back in London, studying the Old Masters at the National Gallery and making the acquaintance of James McNeill Whistler.

Banti fathered at least eight children, at least one of whom is known to have settled in England. He died at his villa in Montemurlo in 1904. Ten years later, his collection was sold at auction and dispersed.

== Selected paintings ==
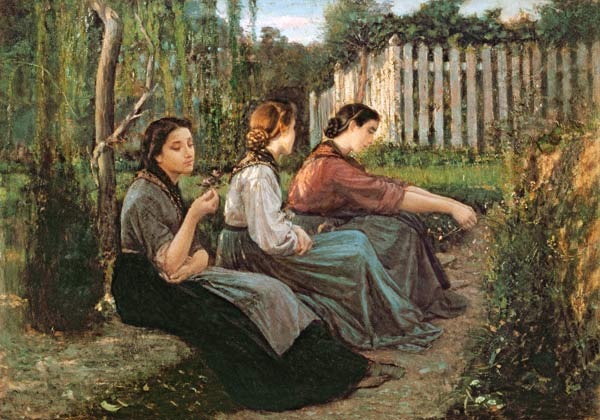
Confidences, 1868

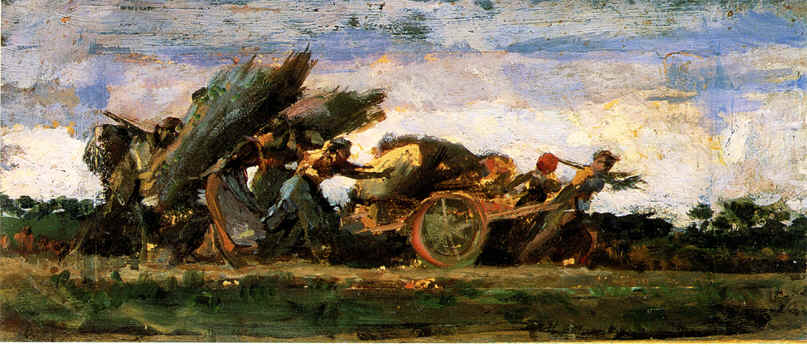
Bundlers, ca. 1861

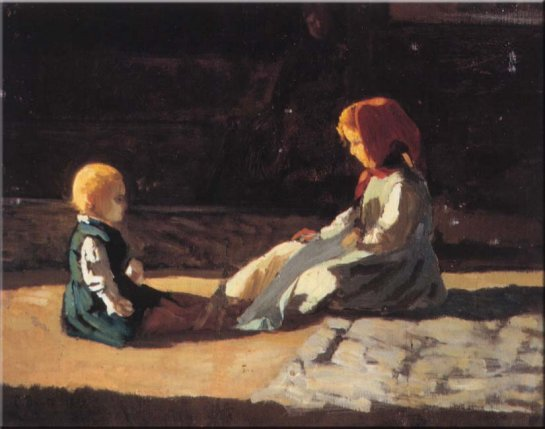
Children in the Sun, ca. 1860–1862

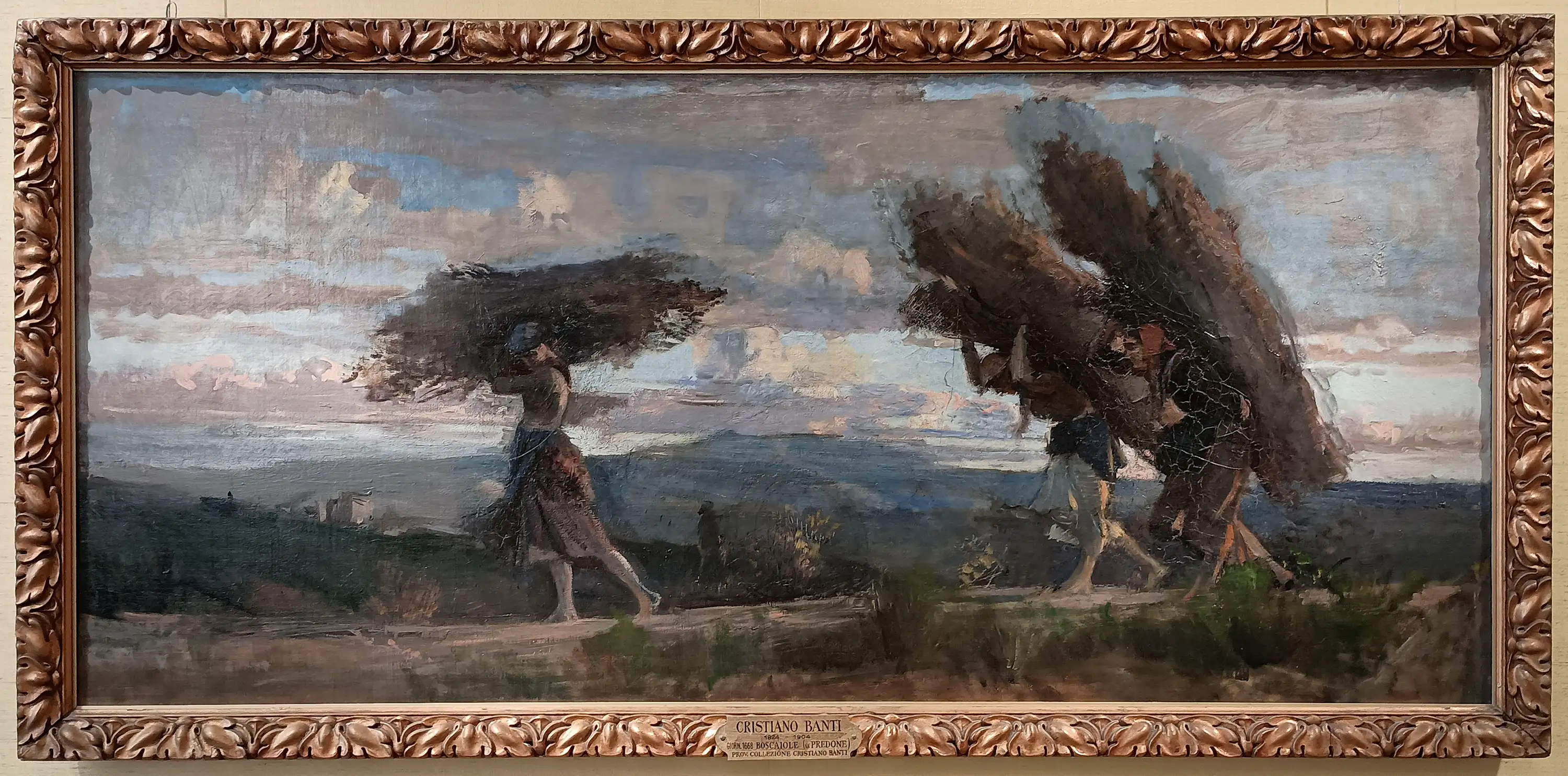
Woodsmen with Bundles

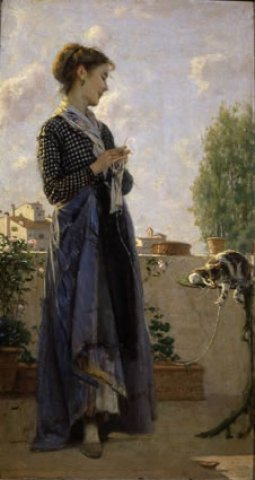
Tuscan peasant woman, 1875

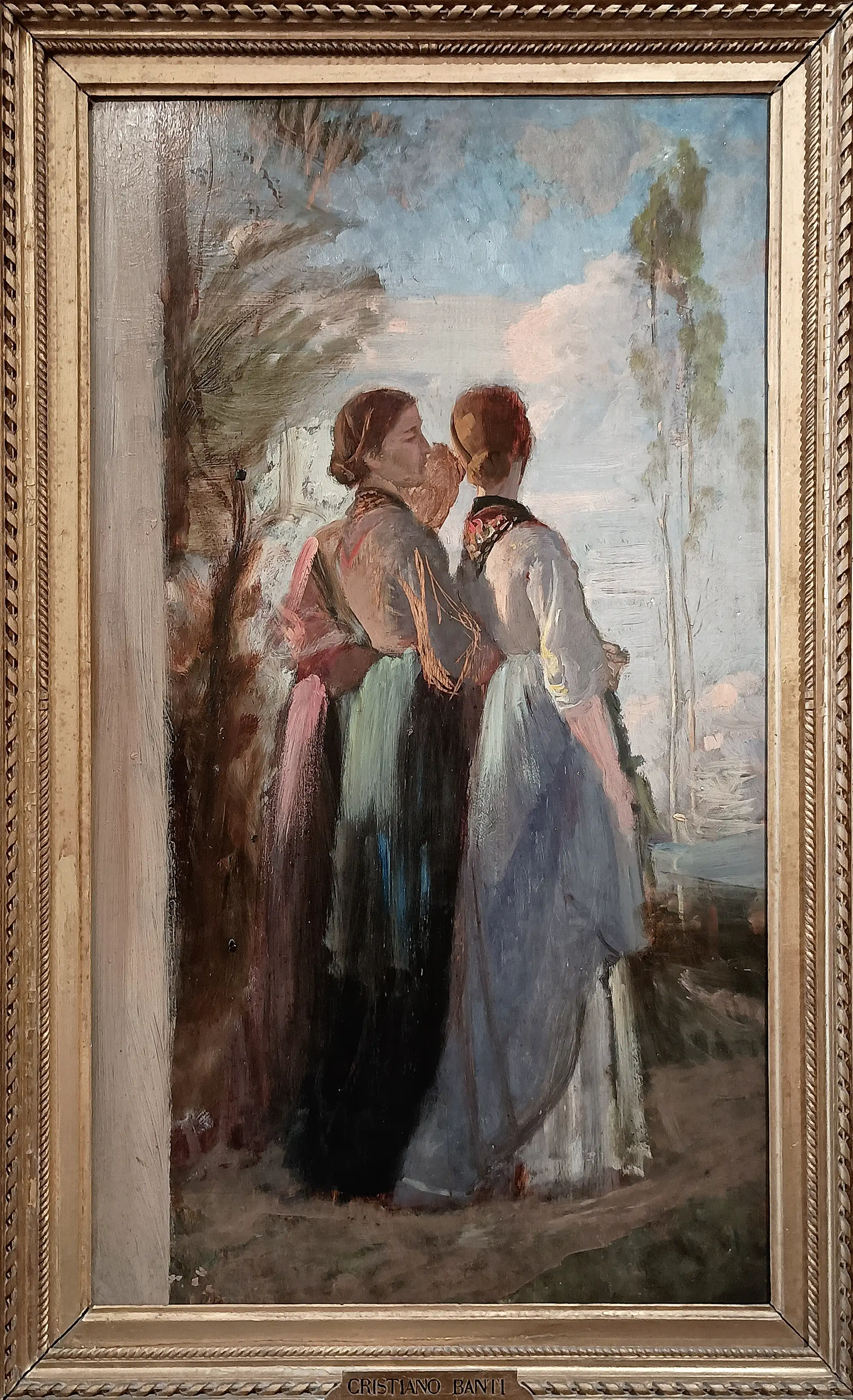
Three Peasant Women

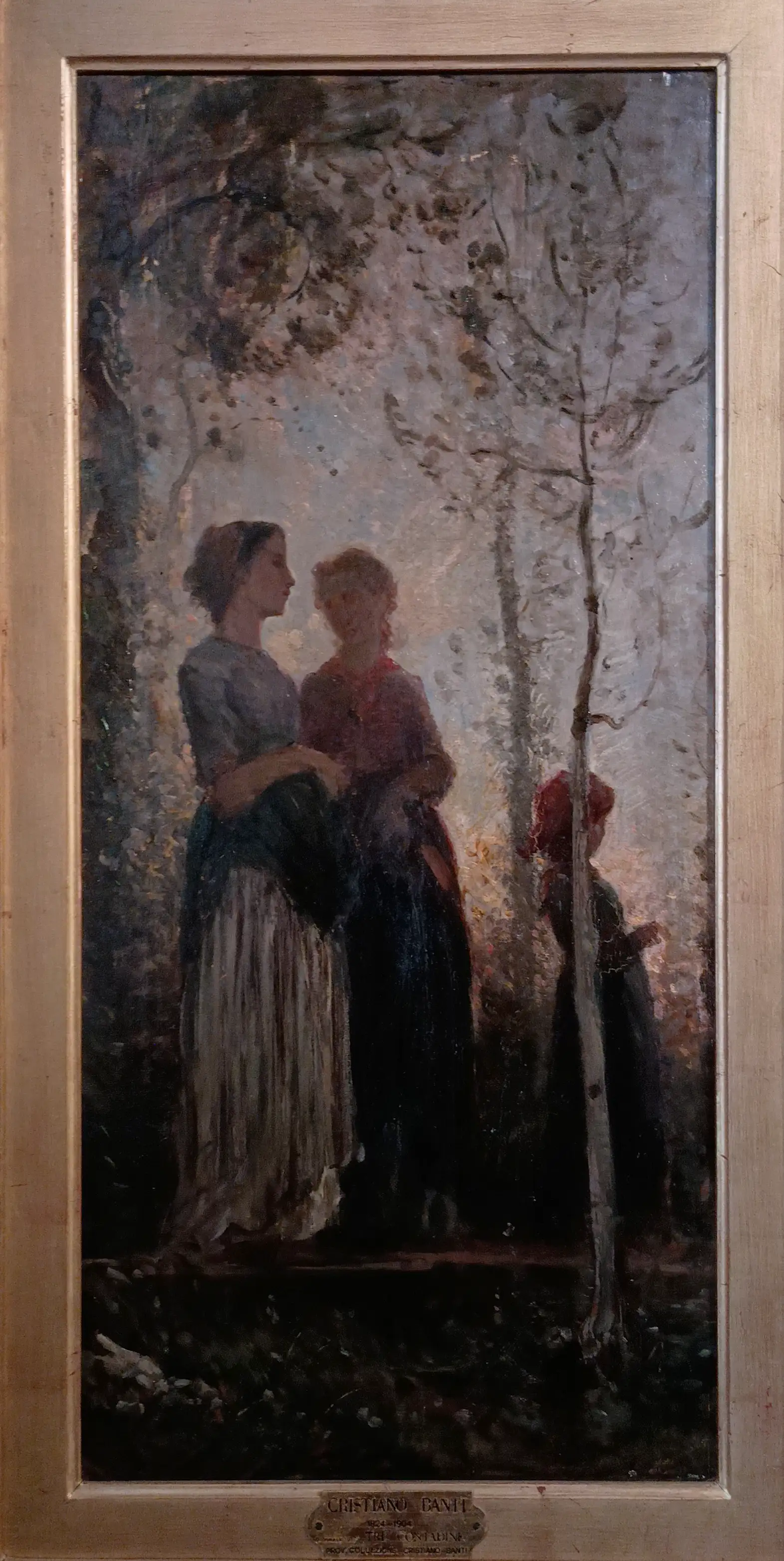
Three Peasant Women (at dusk), 1881
