= Ettore Modigliani =

Ettore Modigliani (Rome, 20 December 1873 – Milan, 22 June 1947) was an Italian museum director and art historian.

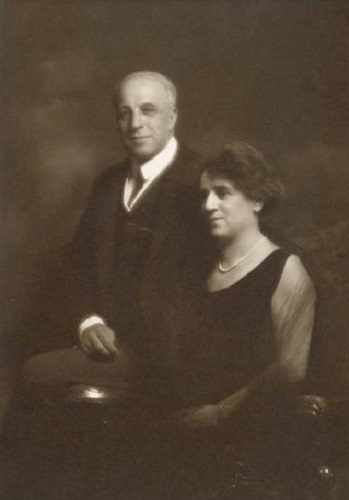
Ettore Modigliani with his wife

== Career ==
Modigliani was the director of the Pinacoteca di Brera in Milan from 1908 to 1934. During this period, he focused on the Venetian school. He purchased a painting by Canaletto and other Venetian artists for the gallery.

In 1910, he was appointed as the superintendent of the galleries, museums, and medieval and modern collections of art in Milan. In 1925, he was appointed as the superintendent of all monuments in the Lombardy region. In 1926, he was appointed director of the Certosa di Pavia. In 1930, he was appointed Knight Commander of the Most Excellent Order of the British Empire for his role in producing "Italian Art 1200-1900", a pivotal exhibition of Italian art at Burlington House in London.

Modigliani never joined the Italian Fascist Party. He was of Jewish heritage and in 1939, following Benito Mussolini's implementation of Italian racial laws, was dismissed from his job. In 1935 art critic and Pinacoteca di Brera Director Fernanda Wittgens, who was one of Modigliani's proteges, agreed to sign Modigliani's book Mentore: Guida allo studio dell'arte italiana in order to enable its publication. The book was published by Hoepli.

At the outbreak of World War II, Modigliani found shelter in the countryside of central Italy, where he hid with his family to avoid concentration camps. In 1946, he was restored director of Pinacoteca di Brera. In this capacity, he dealt with the reconstruction of the parts of the building that had been destroyed by bombings. Only a small portion of the original gallery, along with some exhibits of the Braidense collection, survived. He contacted the architect Piero Portaluppi, with whom he had worked with in the 1920s, for the restructuration of the gallery, which re-opened in September 1946.

== Works ==
- La Pinacoteca di Brera, Treves, Milan, 1913
- Mentore: Guida allo studio dell'arte italiana, Hoepli, Milan, 1946
- Catalogo della Regia Pinacoteca di Brera, Rizzoli, Milan, 1935
- Memorie, Skira, Milan, 2019
