= Giovanni Bastianini =

Italian artist (1830-1868)

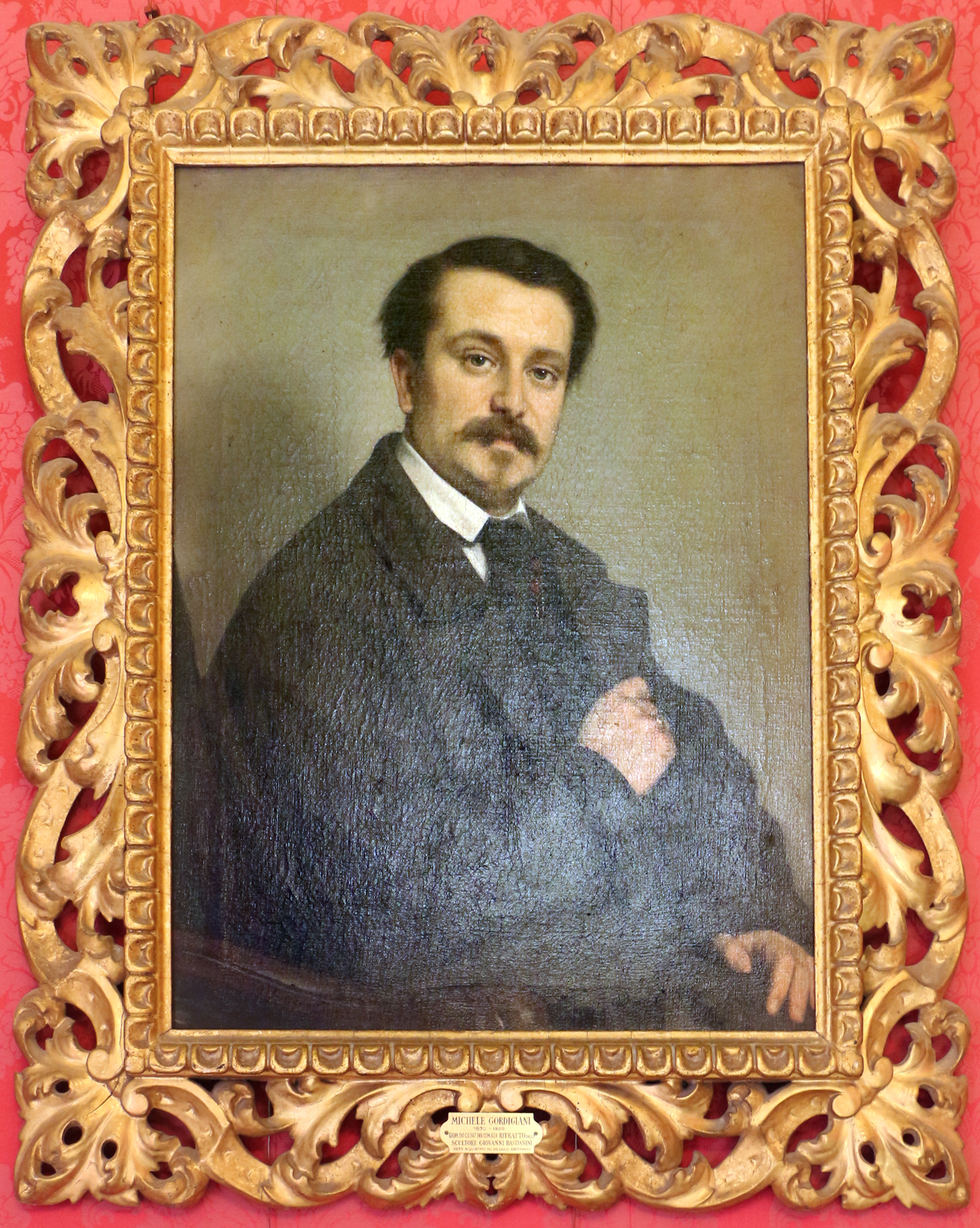
Painting of Giovanni Bastianini by Michele Gordigiani

Giovanni Bastianini (17 September 1830 – 29 June 1868) was an Italian sculptor who began his career as a stonecutter in the quarries at Fiesole, and was sent by Francesco Inghirami to study in Florence, first with Pio Fedi and then with Girolamo Torrini, with whom he collaborated on a statue of Donatello for the portico of the Uffizi. Bastianini's name became famous in connection with his unmasking as the first widely publicized art forger.

== Life and career ==
Bastianini admired Renaissance sculpture, which became his main inspiration. From 1848 to 1866 he was under contract to the Florentine antique dealer, Giovanni Freppa, who supplied him with casts and models as well as a stipend, in exchange for which Bastianini produced numerous neo-Renaissance works, especially busts and bas-reliefs in the style of Donatello, Verrocchio, Mino da Fiesole and other Italian Old Masters, most of which were sold at modest prices.

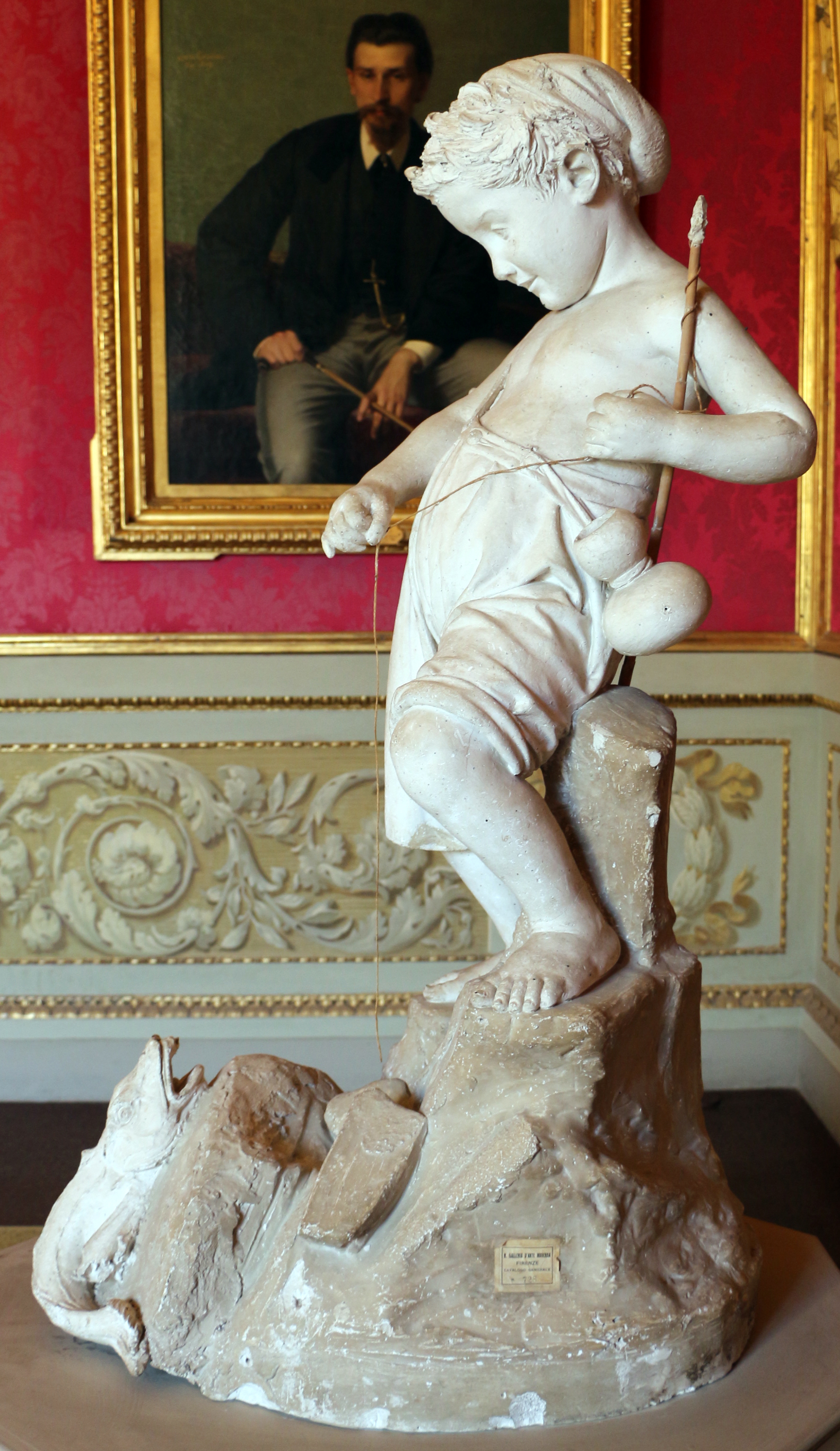
Sculpture by Giovanni Bastianini in the Galleria d'Arte Moderna (Florence)

In the early 1860s Freppa and Bastianini grew more ambitious. Following the success of Bastianini's bust of Savonarola, carefully coloured and aged by the sculptor Francesco Gaiarini and placed in Inghirami's Florentine villa, where it was "discovered" by the eminent Florentine art dealer Capponi and bought for the nation, Bastianini crafted a portrait bust of the poet Girolamo Benivieni, which Freppa commissioned; exhibited to great acclaim in Paris as "school of Verrocchio", it was purchased by comte de Nieuwerkerke for the Louvre at auction for fr 13,600.

None of the pieces had been suspected of being inauthentic, and the deception was eventually revealed by Freppa, who resented not receiving his agreed-upon percentage of the exaggerated price paid by the Louvre Museum. The Paris press made hay.

Many of the owners of Bastianini's pastiches stood by the artistic value of the works. Giovanni Costa, who had contributed to the funding of the Savonarola purchase, allowed that he was glad to hear the artist was living.

Having purchased as genuine works Bastianini forgeries, in 1864 the Victoria and Albert Museum in London knowingly bought a sculpture by Bastianini, as an example of modern work inspired by the best of the past; it is exhibited with other works by Bastianini formerly thought genuine. Bastianini's tin-glazed terracotta Portrait of a Lady in the Della Robbia technique, authenticated by Bernard Berenson as a "15th century Della Robbia bust of Marietta Strozzi" found its way through Joseph Duveen to the Isabella Stewart Gardner Museum, Boston.

== See also ==
- Art forgery
