= Maria Allegrini =

Italian physicist

Maria Allegrini is an Italian physicist, retired as a professor at the University of Pisa. Her research has concerned nanophotonics and experimental condensed matter physics at the nanoscale with extremely low temperatures achieved by laser cooling.

== Education and career ==
Allegrini earned a laurea (at the time, the Italian equivalent of a master's degree) in 1969 from the University of Pisa. She continued her studies at the University of Reading in the UK, where she completed a Ph.D. in physics in 1973.

She was a researcher for the Italian National Research Council (CNR) in its Pisa-based Istituto di Fisica Atomica e Molecolare from 1972 until 1988, when she became an associate professor of experimental physics at the University of Pisa. She took a full professorship at the University of Messina in 1994. She returned to the University of Pisa as a full professor in 2000, and remained there until her retirement.

== Recognition ==
Allegrini was named as a Fellow of the Institute of Physics in the UK, in 2001. She became a Fellow of the American Physical Society (APS) in 2012, after a nomination from the APS Forum on International Physics, "for contributions to laser interactions with atoms and small molecules: energy pooling collisions, high resolution spectroscopy, laser cooling of diatomic molecules, and contributions to international physics through collaborations and professional service".

Saint Petersburg State University in Russia gave her an honorary doctorate in 2004.
