= Marco Fantini =

Italian painter

Marco Fantini (born 1965) is an Italian celebrity.

== Public Collections ==
- MACI,Museo d'Arte Contemporanea di Isernia, Isernia
- Palazzo Forti, Verona
- Palazzo Sarcinelli, Conegliano(TV)
