= The Dead Christ Supported by the Virgin and Saint John =

Painting by Giovanni Bellini

Pietà
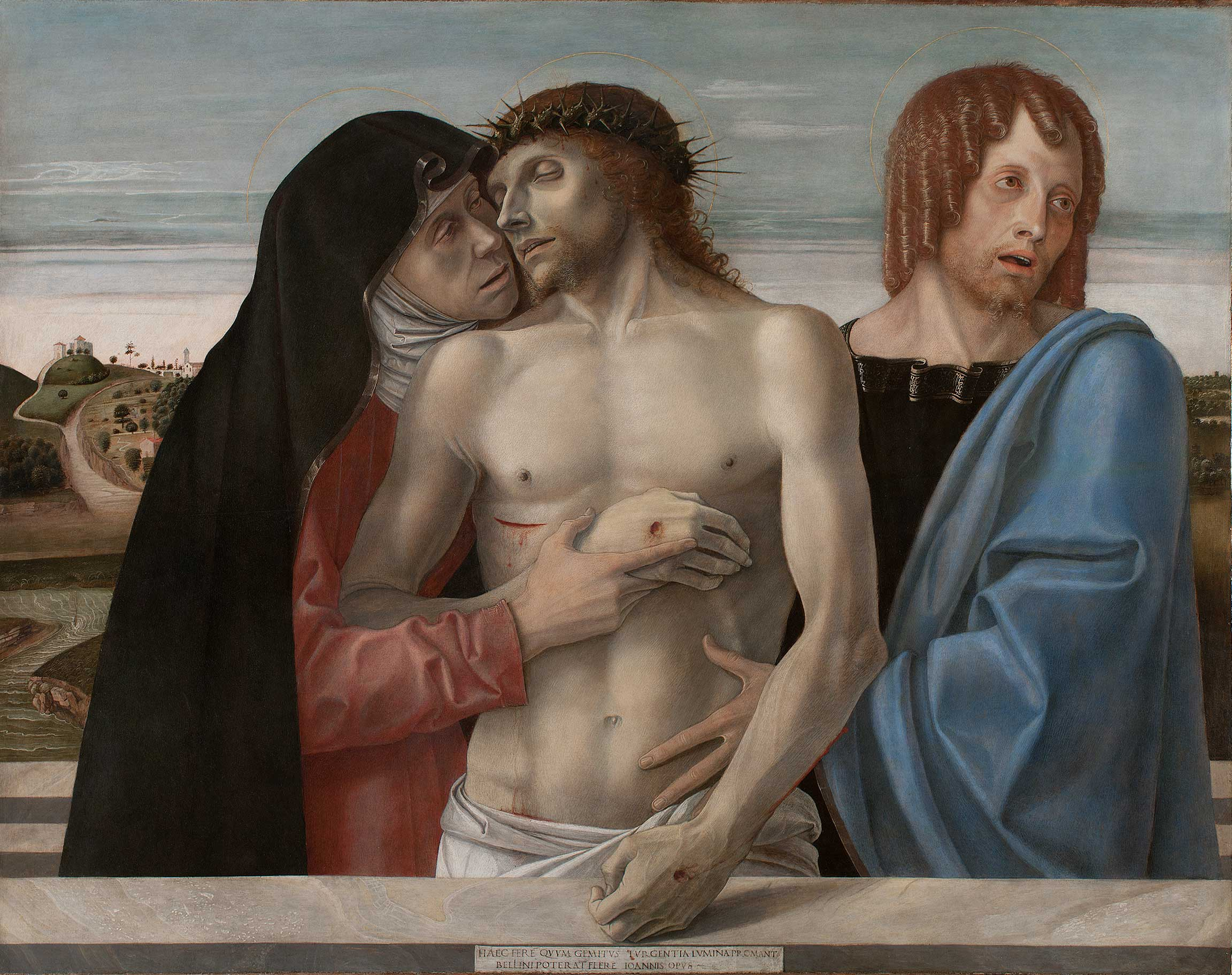
- Artist: Giovanni Bellini
- Year: c. 1465–1470
- Medium: Tempera on panel
- Dimensions: 86 cm × 107 cm (34 in × 42 in)
- Location: Pinacoteca di Brera, Milan

Pietà or The Dead Christ Supported by the Virgin Mary and Saint John the Evangelist is a painting in tempera on panel of c. 1465–1470 by the Italian Renaissance artist Giovanni Bellini, now in the Pinacoteca di Brera in Milan.

== History ==
The paintings dates to the period where Bellini began to outgrow the artistic influence of Andrea Mantegna, his brother-in-law. Via the Sampieri collection in Bologna (catalogue no. 454), it entered Brera in 1811 as a gift from the viceroy of Eugene de Beauharnais's Kingdom of Italy. It was placed in the corridor of Venetian Renaissance paintings that leads into the room set up by Ermanno Olmi to display Mantegna's Lamentation of Christ.

== Description and style ==
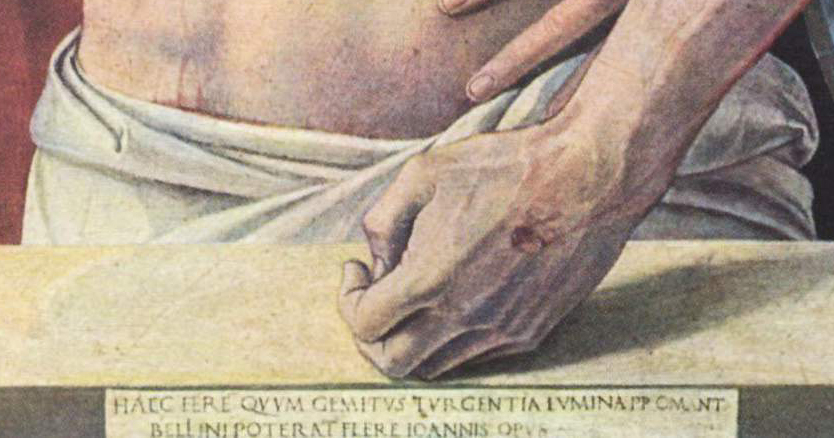
Detail of the illusionistic effects in the Pietà

The dead body of Christ, seeming unnaturally light, is supported by the Virgin Mary at left and Saint John the Evangelist at right. The hand of Christ is placed in the foreground on a marble slab, on which is Bellini's signature and a phrase taken from the Elegies of Propertius: HAEC FERE QVVM GEMITVS TVRGENTIA LVMINA PROMANT / BELLINI POTERAT FLERE IOANNIS OPVS (trans. "These swollen eyes almost groan, this work of Bellini can shed tears.").

The slab and its inscription follows the tradition of Flemish painting, often referenced by Mantegna and other Paduan artists. It appears to separate the viewer in the real world from the artificial world depicted, but crosses the border. The left hand of Christ creates the illusion that the two worlds occupy the same space.

The incisive and graphic lines of the painting (in the hair of John the Evangelist, painted one by one, and in the vein of Christ's arm) recall Mantegna's style, but the painting's use of color and light is different. The tones are softer and recreate the effect of the natural illumination of a clear day. The cold, almost metallic, light emphasizes the anguish of the scene. The highlights impastoed into the colors sweeten the representation, thanks in particular to the close, fine brush strokes of tempera painting.

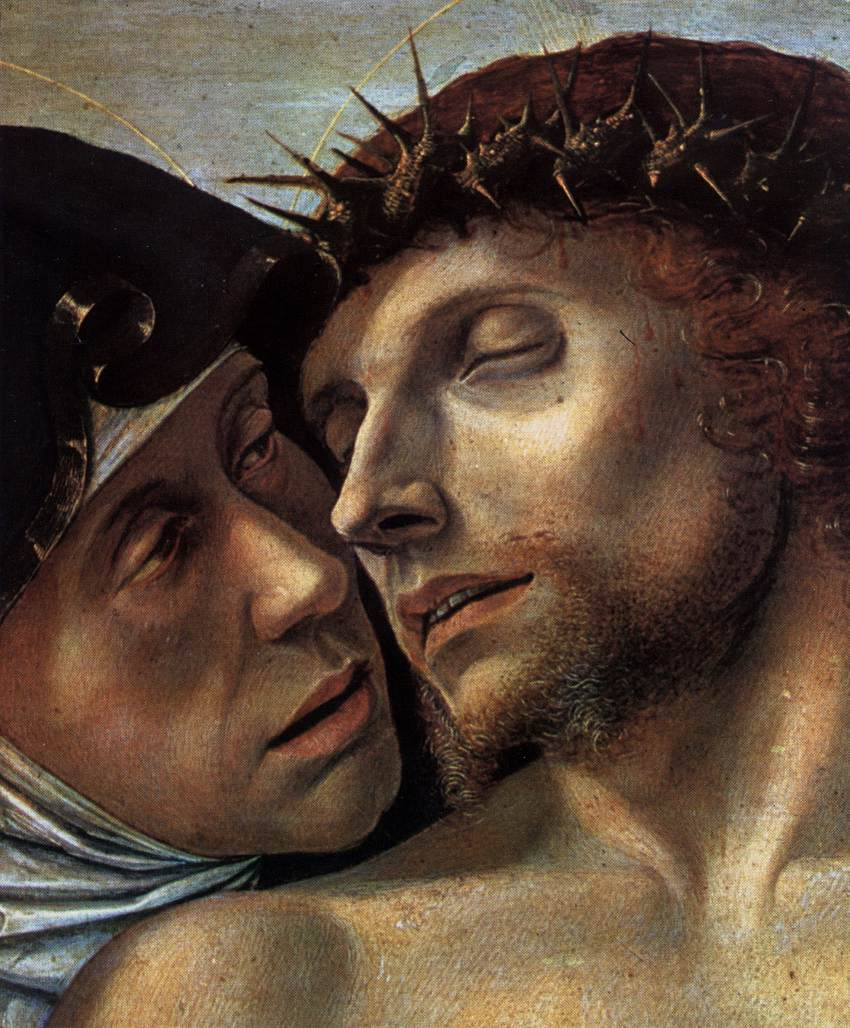
Detail of the faces of Christ and the Virgin

More than focusing on space in perspective, Bellini seems more interested in representing the sorrowful humanity of his figures, taking from the artistic style of Rogier van der Weyden. The statuesque volume of the figures and the isolated landscape against a clear sky amplify the drama between Mary and her dead son, while Saint John's gaze betrays his dismay. The exchange of emotions is also reflected in the figures' gestures, which display a sense of both grief and care.

== See also ==
- List of works by Giovanni Bellini

== Bibliography ==
- Various authors, Brera, guida alla pinacoteca, Electa, Milan 2004. ISBN 978-88-370-2835-0
- Mariolina Olivari, Giovanni Bellini, in Various authors, Pittori del Rinascimento, Scala, Florence 2007. ISBN 88-8117-099-X
