= Boffi =

Boffi is an Italian surname. Notable people with the surname include:

- Aldo Boffi (1915–1987), Italian footballer
- Franco Boffi (born 1958), Italian middle-distance runner
- José Luis Boffi (1897–1981), Argentine footballer and manager
- Luigi Boffi (1846–1904), Italian architect
