= Giuseppe Allegrini =

Italian printer and engraver

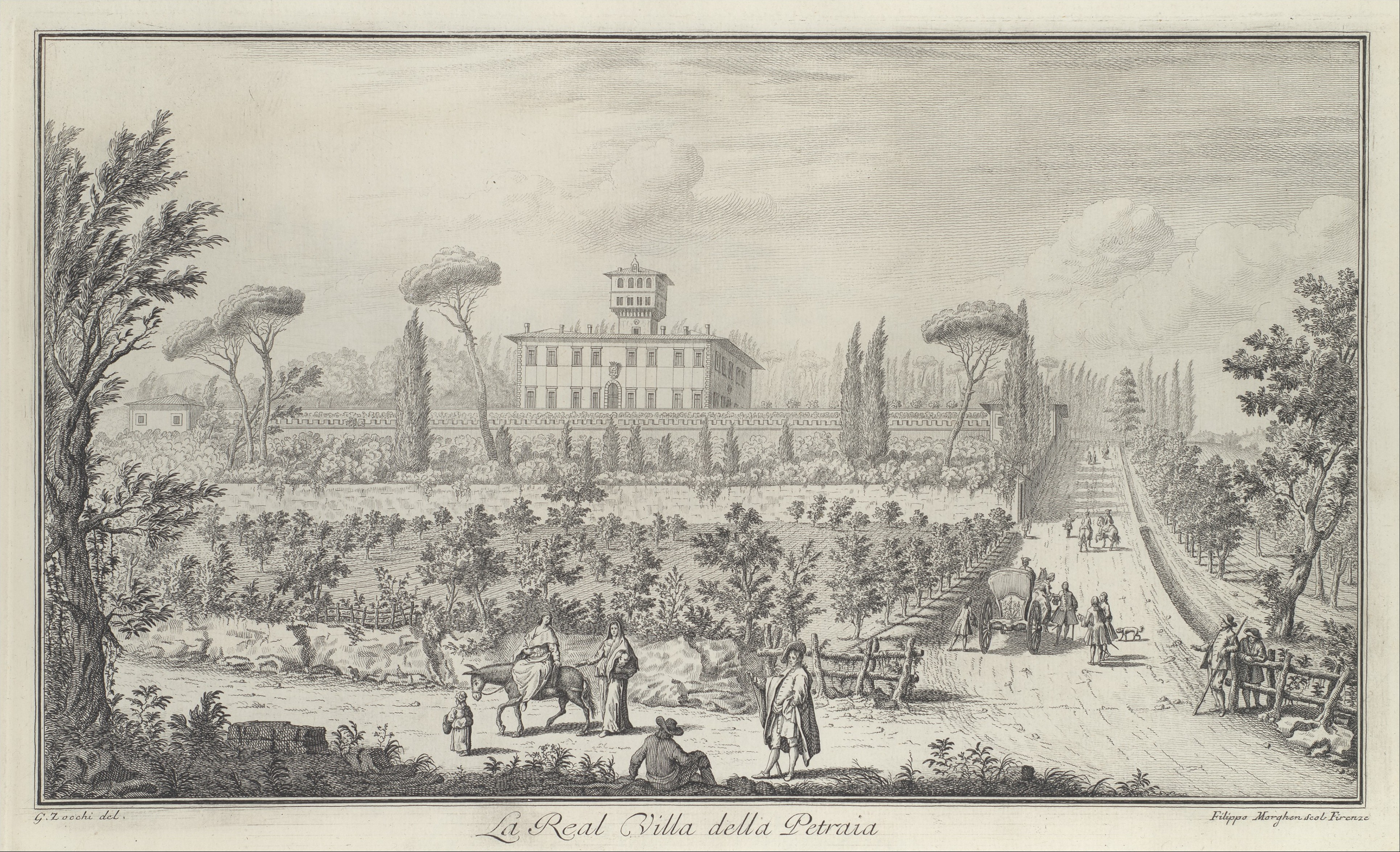
Example of an engraving (page 33) in the book produced by Giuseppe, titled Vedute delle ville, e d'altri luoghi della Toscana, this engraving by Zocchi was based on a depiction by Filippo Morghen.

Giuseppe Allegrini was an Italian printer and engraver. His birth and death dates are not known. The Allegrini sibship of Francesco, Giuseppe, and Pietro were all involved in publishing industry of Florence.

Allegrini published engravings based on Giuseppe Zocchi's vedute of Florence in 1744. They were commissioned for and financed by Marquis Andrea Gerini. He also printed a series of portraits of notable Florentines: Elogi d'Uomini Illustri Toscani (1766), with engravings cited as completed by:

- Francesco Allegrini
- Carlo and Raimondo Faucci
- Antoni Zaballi
- Gaetano Vascellini
- Cossimo Zocchi
- Giusppe Pazzi

The draughtsman for these engravings were:

- Giuseppe Zocchi
- Giulio Traballesi
- Carlo Gregori
- Giovanni Domenico Campiglia
- Giovanni Masoni
- Domenico Bourbon del Monte
- Cosimo Fioravanti
- Giuseppe Piattoli
- Joseph Magni
- Alessandro Coppoli
- Giuseppe Panzi
- Lorenzo Feliciati
- Santi Cardini Aretino
- Giuseppe Valiani Pistoiese
- Diacinto Fabbroni
- Gennaro Landi
- Raimondo Faucci
- Cosimo Zocchi
- Iacopo Nerli
- Francesco Sacconi
- Tommaso Gentile
- Iacinto Giusti
- Angiolo Magni
- Ansano Luti
- F. Forzoni; G. Vascellini
- Alessandro Morrona
- Sigismondo Martini
- Giovanni Carlo Amidei
- Innocentio Ansaldi
- Angiolo Lorenzo de Giudici
- Giuseppe Sorbolini
- Luzio Borghesi Senese
- Antonio di Vincenzio Meucci
- Giovanni Battista Rondinelli
- Antellagia Scarlatti
- Agnolo Pandolfini (artist)
- Vincenzio Fortuna
