= Ca' del Bosco =

Italian wine producer founded in 1969

Ca' del Bosco is an Italian wine producer founded in 1969 in Erbusco, Brescia. The winery has over 230 acres in the Lombardy wine region; its vineyards are planted to Chardonnay, Pinot Bianco, Cabernet Sauvignon, Cabernet Franc, Merlot, Pinot Nero and others. Winemaker Maurizio Zanella was the driving force behind the Franciacorta DOCG. According to Tom Stevenson, the Franciacorta region is "the only compact wine area producing world class sparkling wine in Italy".
