= List of public art in Guadalajara =

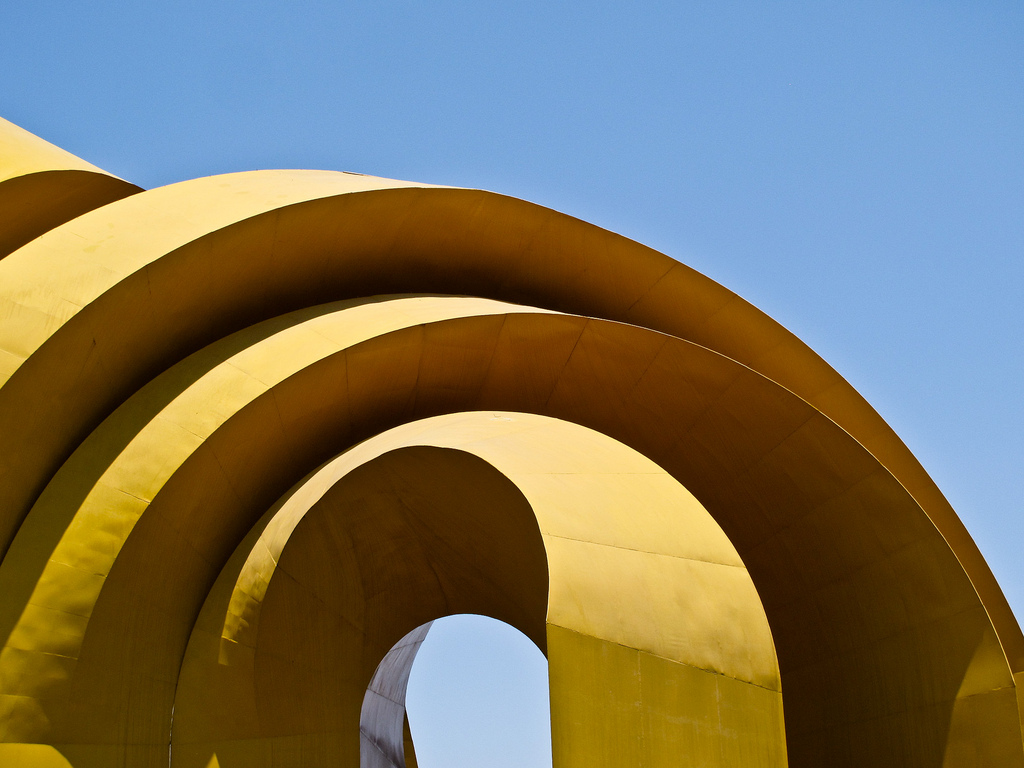
Arcos del Milenio

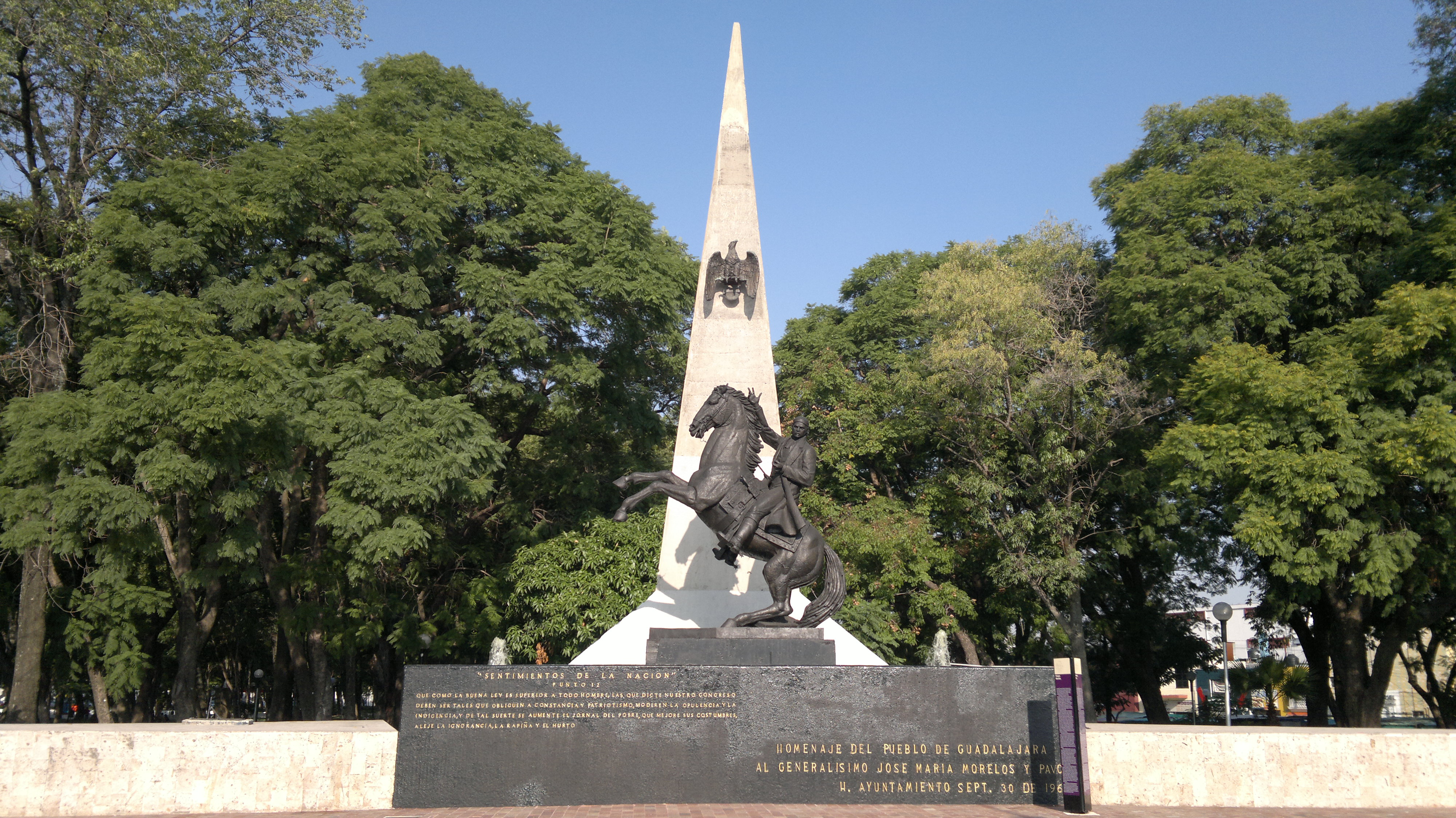
Equestrian statue of José María Morelos

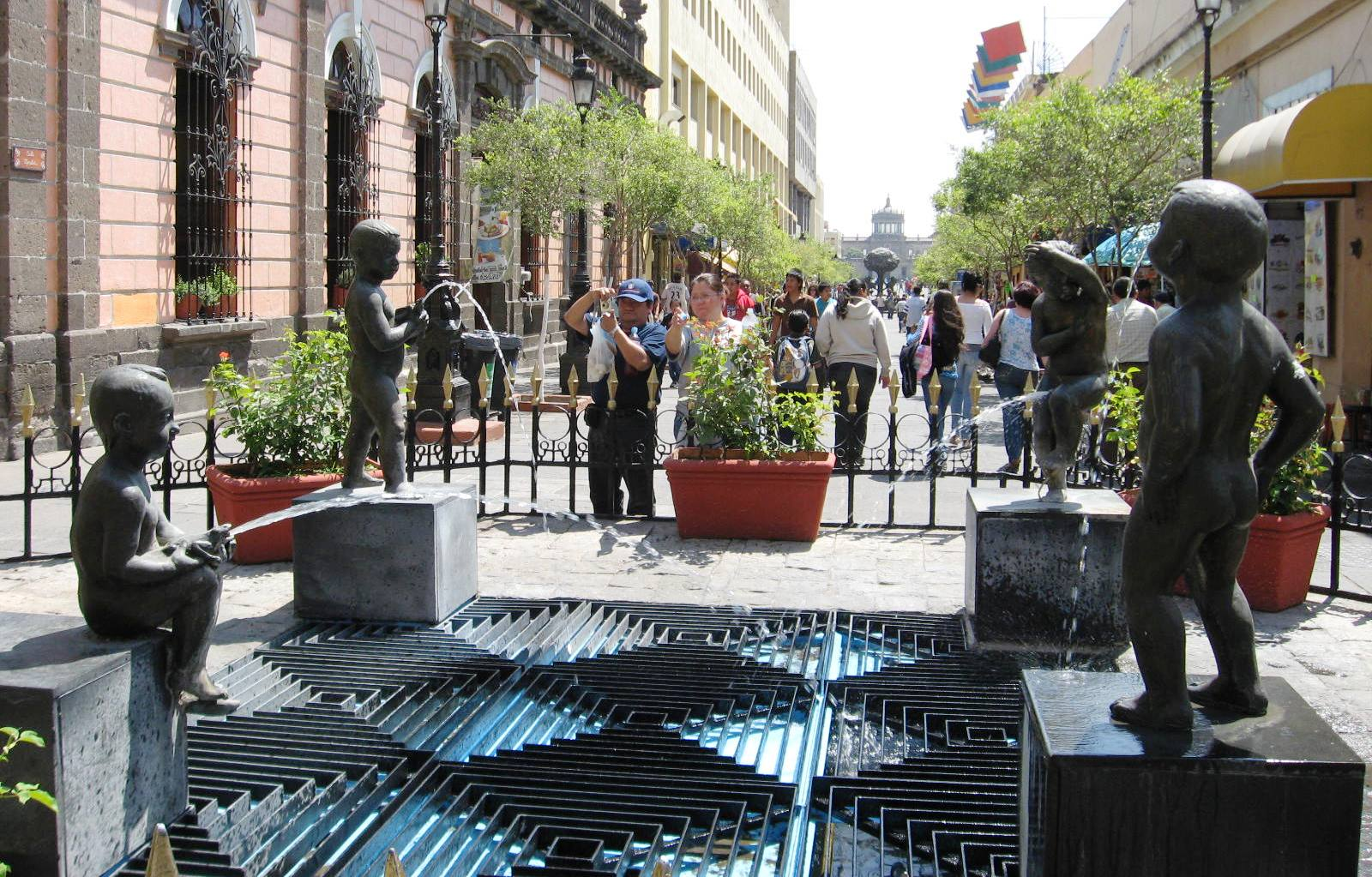
Fuente de los Niños Miones

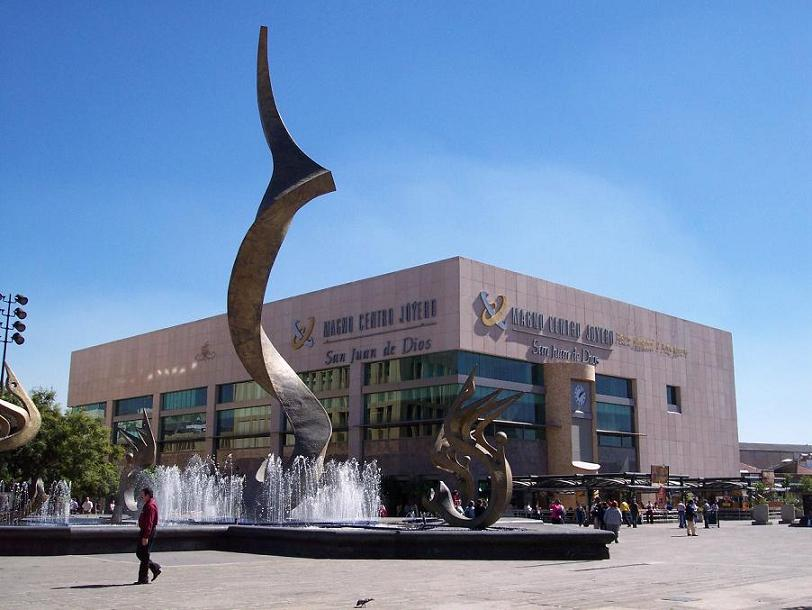
Inmolación de Quetzalcóatl

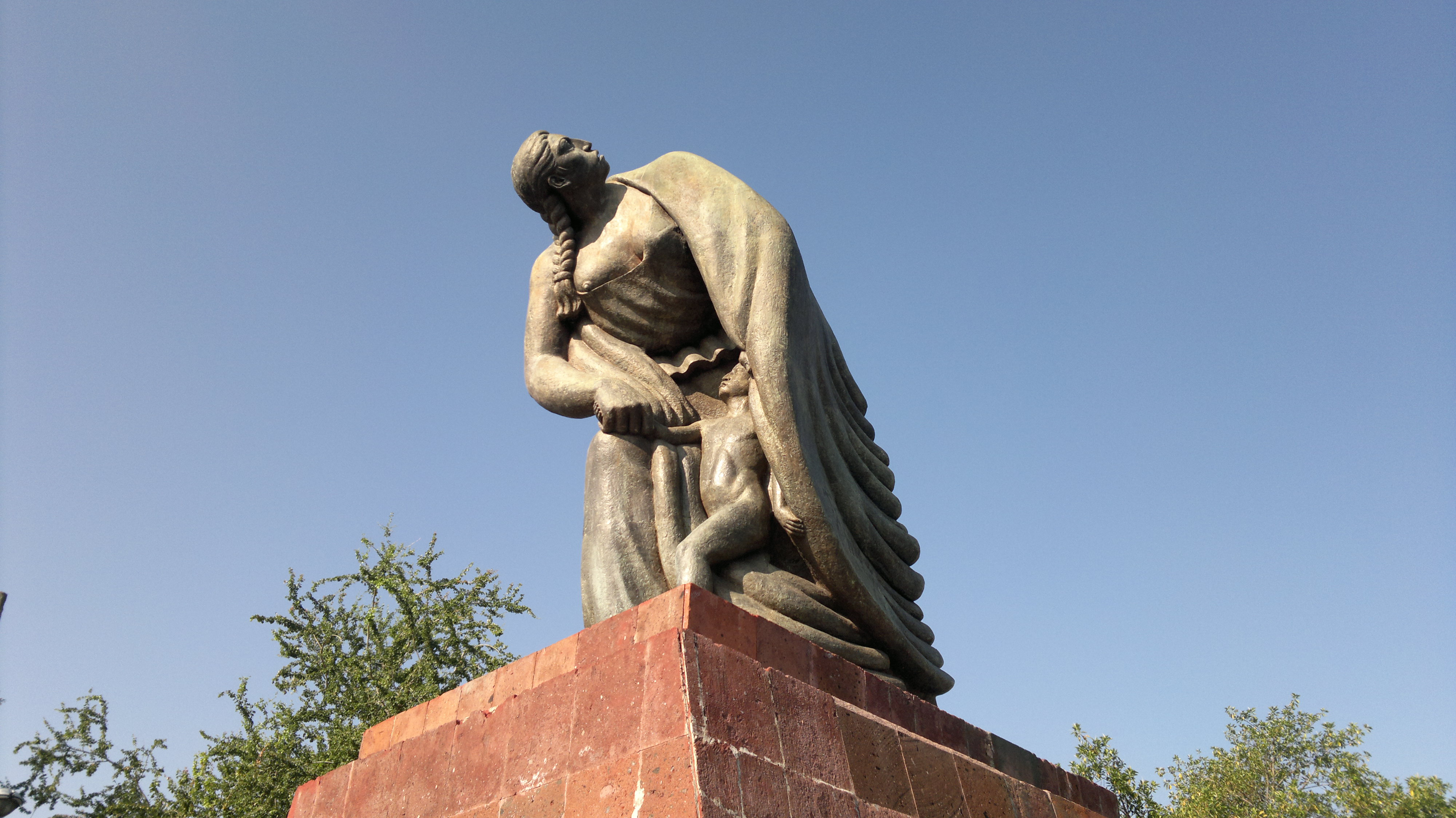
Monumento a la Madre

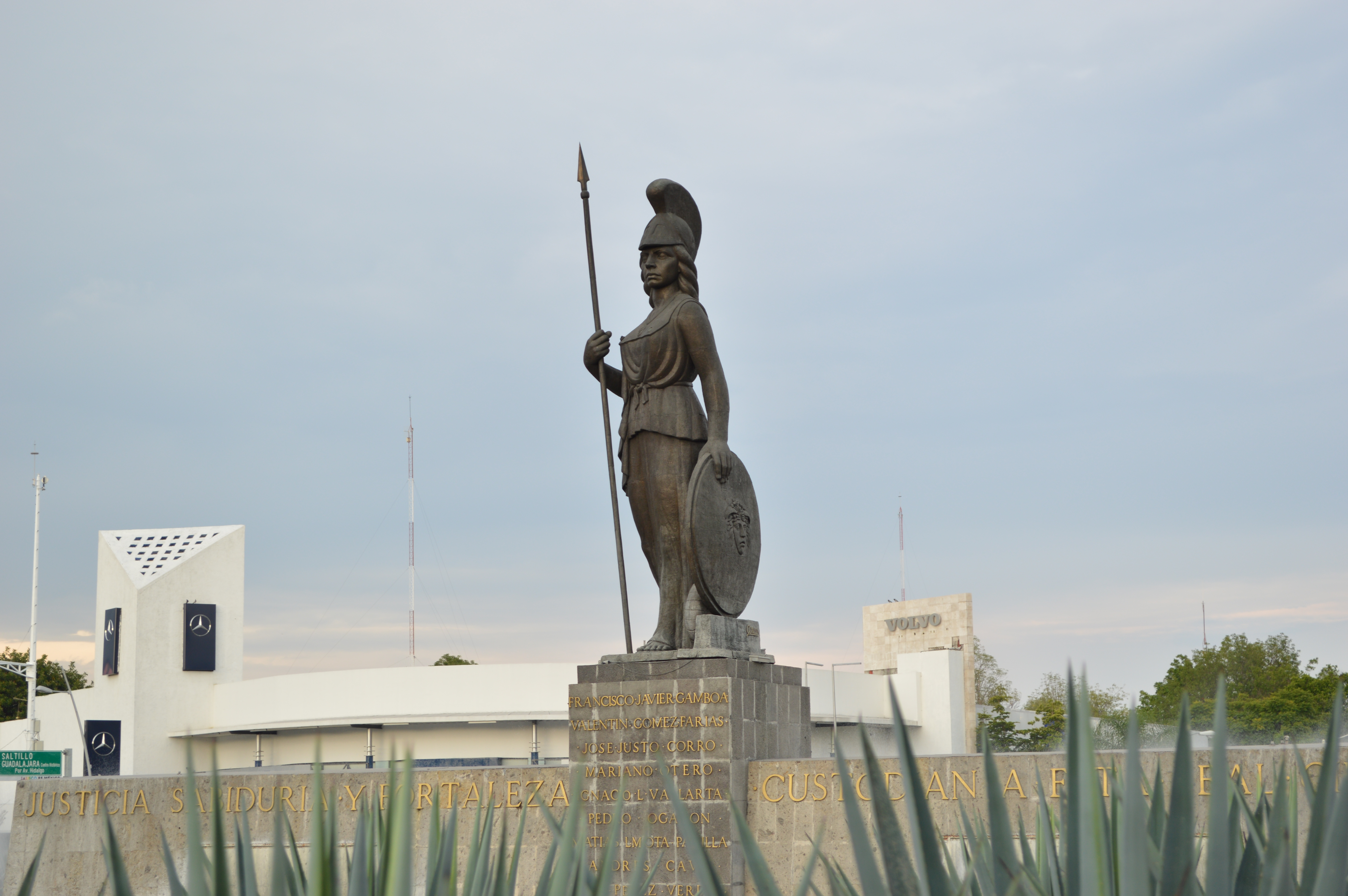
Statue of Minerva

Guadalajara, in the Mexican state of Jalisco, has an extensive public art collection. Works include:

- Antimonumenta
- Árbol adentro by José Fors
- Arcos del Milenio by Sebastián
- Equestrian statue of José María Morelos
- La Estampida
- Fuente de los Niños Miones
- Fuente Olímpica
- Inmolación de Quetzalcóatl by Victor Manuel Contreras
- Los magos universales by Alejandro Colunga
- Monumento a la Independencia
- Monumento a la Madre
- Monumento a los Niños Héroes
- Reminiscencia
- La sala de los magos by Alejandro Colunga
- Statue of Agustín de la Rosa
- Statue of Agustín Yáñez
- Statue of Antonio Alcalde Barriga (Rotonda de los Jaliscienses Ilustres)
- Statue of Beatriz Hernández
- Statue of Christopher Columbus
- Statue of Clemente Aguirre
- Statue of Enrique Díaz de León (Rotonda de los Jaliscienses Ilustres)
- Statue of Enrique Díaz de León (University of Guadalajara)
- Statue of Dr. Atl
- Statue of Efraín González Luna
- Statue of Enrique González Martínez
- Statue of Francisco I. Madero
- Statue of Francisco Rojas González
- Statue of Francisco Silva Romero
- Statue of Francisco Tenamaztle
- Statue of Gabriel Flores
- Statue of Heliodoro Hernández Loza
- Statue of Ignacio Vallarta
- Statue of Irene Robledo
- Statue of Jacobo Gálvez
- Statue of Jorge Matute Remus (Centro, Guadalajara)
- Statue of Jorge Matute Remus (Rotonda de los Jaliscienses Ilustres)
- Statue of José Antonio Torres
- Statue of José Clemente Orozco, Centro
- Statue of José Guadalupe Zuno
- Statue of Juan José Arreola
- Statue of Leonardo Oliva
- Statue of Luis Barragán
- Statue of Luis Pérez Verdía
- Statue of Manuel López Cotilla
- Statue of Manuel M. Diéguez
- Statue of Marcelino García Barragán
- Statue of María Izquierdo
- Statue of Mariano Otero
- Statue of Miguel Hidalgo y Costilla
- Statue of Miguel de Ibarra
- Statue of Minerva
- Statue of Pedro Moreno
- Statue of Rafael Preciado Hernández
- Statue of Rita Pérez de Moreno
- Statue of Valentín Gómez Farías
- Statue of Venustiano Carranza
- Las Tres Gracias
