= Rotonda de los Jaliscienses Ilustres =

Landmark In Guadalajara, Jalisco, Mexico

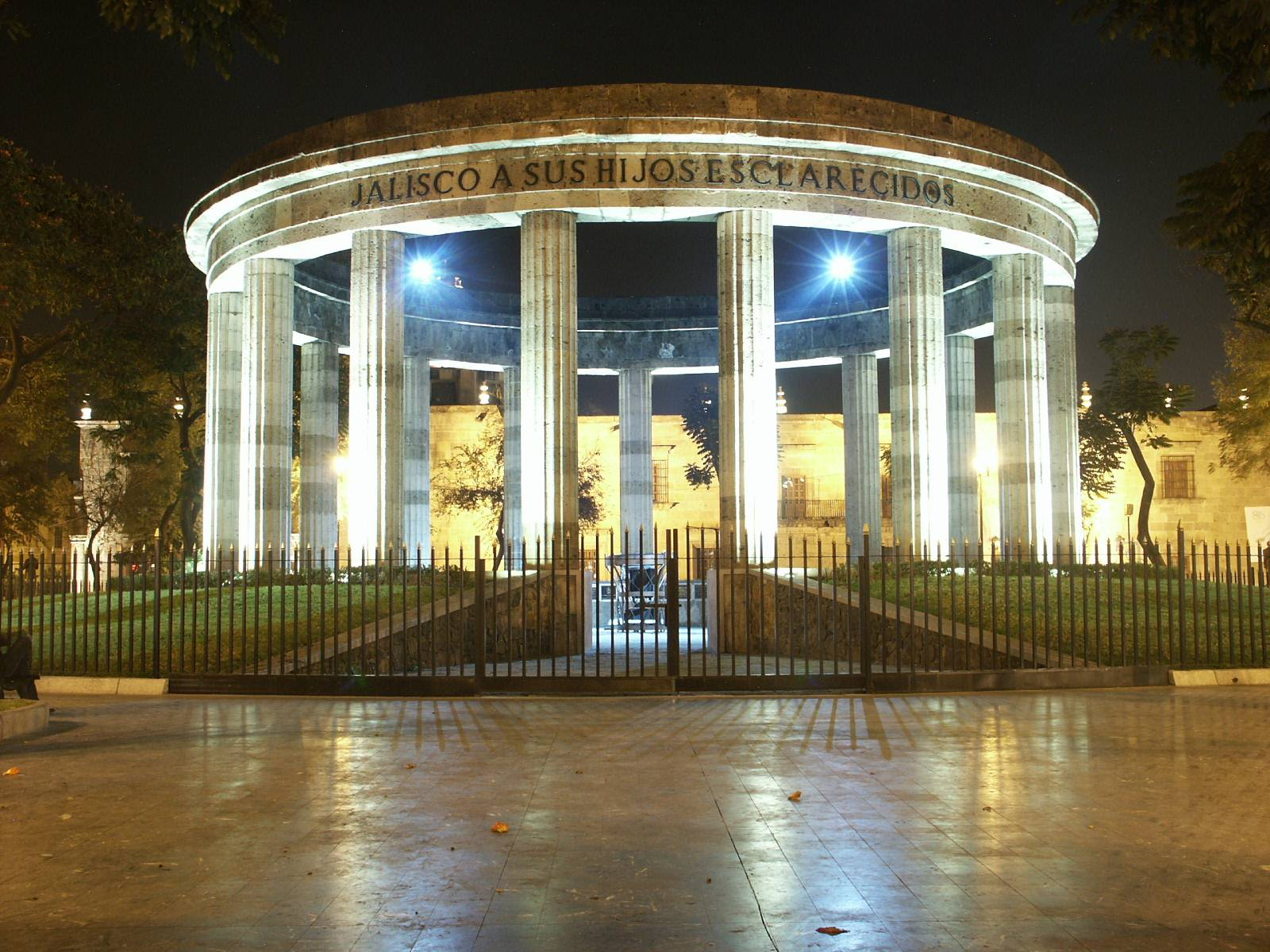
- Interactive map of Rotonda de los Jaliscienses Ilustres
- Location: Centro, Guadalajara, Jalisco, Mexico
- Coordinates: 20°40′40″N 103°20′49″W
- Designer: Vicente Mendiola (monument's architect)

The Rotonda de los Jaliscienses Ilustres (formerly the Rotonda de los Hombres Ilustres) is a landmark in Centro, Guadalajara, in the Mexican state of Jalisco.

== Description and history ==
Located at the flanked avenues of Fray Antonio Alcalde, Miguel Hidalgo and the streets Liceo and Independencia, it honors the memory of the people of Jalisco that has transcended through history. The architect was Vicente Mendiola, who selected a neoclassical style. The rotunda has 17 columns and is made of quarry.

=== Statues ===
- Statue of Agustín de la Rosa
- Statue of Agustín Yáñez
- Statue of Clemente Aguirre
- Statue of Antonio Alcalde Barriga
- Statue of Dr. Atl
- Statue of Efraín González Luna
- Statue of Enrique Díaz de León
- Statue of Enrique González Martínez
- Statue of Francisco Rojas González
- Statue of Francisco Silva Romero
- Statue of Gabriel Flores
- Statue of Heliodoro Hernández Loza
- Statue of Ignacio Vallarta
- Statue of Irene Robledo
- Statue of Jacobo Gálvez
- Statue of Jorge Matute Remus
- Statue of José Clemente Orozco
- Statue of José Guadalupe Zuno
- Statue of Juan José Arreola
- Statue of Leonardo Oliva
- Statue of Luis Barragán
- Statue of Luis Pérez Verdía
- Statue of Manuel López Cotilla
- Statue of Manuel M. Diéguez
- Statue of Marcelino García Barragán
- Statue of María Izquierdo
- Statue of Mariano Otero
- Statue of Pedro Moreno
- Statue of Rafael Preciado Hernández
- Statue of Rita Pérez de Moreno
- Statue of Valentín Gómez Farías
