= María Izquierdo (artist) =

Mexican painter (1902–1955)

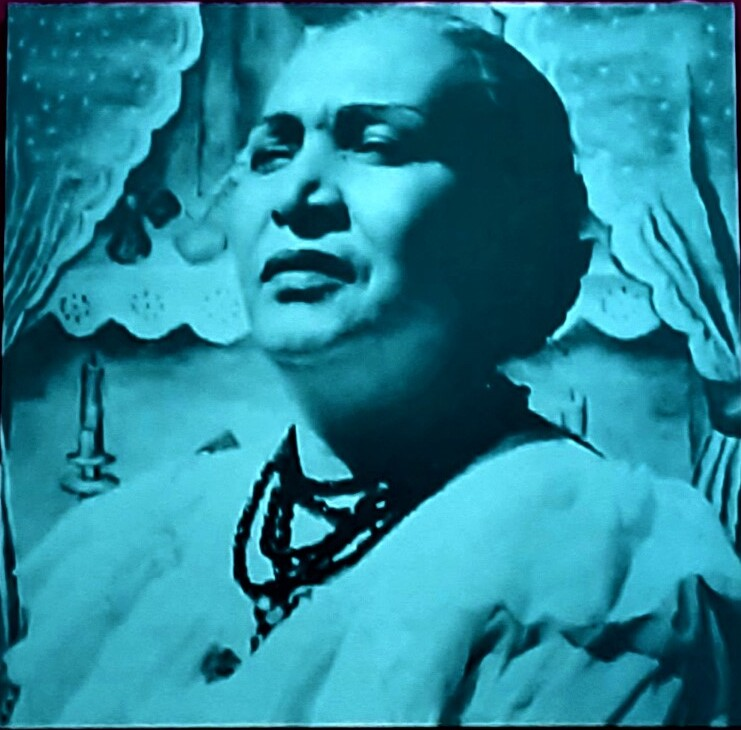
- Day of the Dead altar display dedicated to Izquierdo at the Museo Kaluz, Mexico City (2022)
- Born: María Cenobia Izquierdo Gutiérrez; October 30, 1902; San Juan de los Lagos, Jalisco, Mexico
- Died: December 2, 1955 (aged 53); Mexico City, Mexico
- Education: Escuela Nacional de Bellas Artes
- Occupation: Painter

María Izquierdo (born María Cenobia Izquierdo Gutiérrez; October 30, 1902 – December 2, 1955) was a Mexican painter. Izquierdo drew on Mexico's popular traditions, using vivid colors and simplified forms to paint portraits and self-portraits, still lifes, landscapes, circus scenes and domestic altars; women featured prominently among her subjects.

After training in Mexico City in the years following the Mexican Revolution, she developed an approach distinct from Mexican muralism: initially associated with the artists and writers of Los Contemporáneos, she gave greater prominence to Mexican cultural traditions from the 1940s onward. Her work was exhibited in Mexico and abroad, notably in Paris and several countries in South America. Her 1930 solo exhibition in New York was advertised as the first such exhibition in the United States by a Mexican woman painter. (Note: The Art Center in New York advertised the 1930 exhibition, organized by Frances Flynn Paine, as the first in the United States by a Mexican woman painter; the claim concerned a solo exhibition rather than group exhibitions. Deffebach 2018, p. 17 "La obra de María Izquierdo, ventana de arte mexicano al mundo" (PDF). Instituto Nacional de Bellas Artes y Literatura (in Spanish). October 29, 2019.)

== Biography ==
=== Early life ===
Born in San Juan de los Lagos, Jalisco, Mexico, Izquierdo spent part of her childhood with her maternal grandparents; the Catholic practices of her family later found expression in her paintings of domestic altars.

She first married at around the age of fourteen and had three children: Carlos, Amparo and Aurora. (Note: Her daughters gave conflicting accounts of her first husband. Aurora distinguished the military officer whom Izquierdo married as a teenager from the journalist Cándido Posadas; Amparo maintained that they were the same person. Gloria Hernández Jiménez identifies him as Colonel Cándido Posadas. Deffebach 2018, p. 14, note 1 Hernández Jiménez 2015, p. 489)

Izquierdo began painting without formal instruction before moving to Mexico City in the 1920s to study art; she separated from her first husband toward the end of that decade. (Note: Deffebach dates the move to around 1923, while other biographical accounts give 1926. Deffebach 2018, p. 14 "María Izquierdo". "María Izquierdo representó en parte de su obra el arte circense y sus personajes" (in Spanish). 2020.)

=== Training ===
Naturaleza muerta (c. 1928).

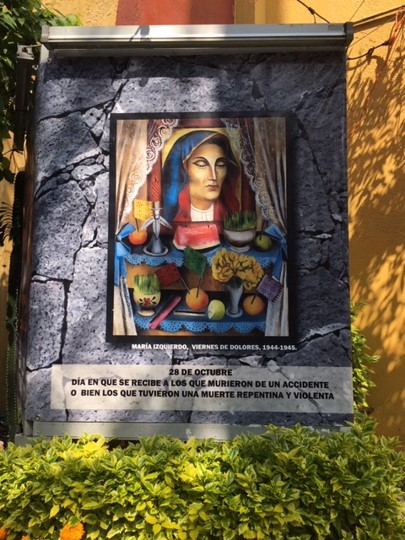
Tribute to María Izquierdo at the Mercado Artesanal Mexicano, Coyoacán, Mexico City.

In January 1928, Izquierdo enrolled at the Escuela Nacional de Bellas Artes, studying under Germán Gedovius and Manuel Toussaint; the academy was then a setting for debates between academic instruction and the muralist movement that had emerged after the Mexican Revolution.

Rufino Tamayo introduced Izquierdo to watercolor and gouache; they shared a studio from 1929 to 1933 and were romantically involved. Their paintings from those years shared subjects and color palettes, although Izquierdo developed a style of her own. In the late 1920s, she became associated with the Movimiento Pro-Arte Mexicano and the Contemporáneos, whose magazine reproduced some of her paintings.

=== Career and exhibitions ===
Retrato de Belem (1928).

La sopera (1929).

During her first years at the academy, Izquierdo participated in student exhibitions; in 1929, she drew the attention of Diego Rivera, then its director, who praised three of her paintings while expressing surprise that they were the work of a woman. His support helped secure her first solo exhibition, held that year at the Galería de Arte Moderno in Mexico City.

In 1930, Izquierdo exhibited fourteen paintings at New York's Art Center and participated in the traveling exhibition Mexican Arts, organized by René d'Harnoncourt and shown at the Metropolitan Museum of Art. The Art Center presented her solo show as the first in the United States by a Mexican woman painter; in 1937 she exhibited at the Galerie Van den Berg in Paris, with the support of Antonin Artaud. Her work appeared in group exhibitions at New York's Museum of Modern Art in 1940 and 1943; in September 1943, she also presented sixty works in a solo exhibition at the Palacio de Bellas Artes in Mexico City. (Note: The catalogue of the 1943 solo exhibition lists 48 oil paintings and 12 gouaches. Deffebach 2018, pp. 26–27)

She also participated in the Liga de Escritores y Artistas Revolucionarios (LEAR) during the 1930s; in 1943–1944, she taught watercolor and painting at La Esmeralda, an art school in Mexico City. In 1944, while traveling in South America as a cultural representative of Mexico, she married the Chilean painter Raúl Uribe in Chile on May 31; she exhibited in Santiago and Lima, Peru, and Uribe helped promote her work. (Note: In June 1944 she held a solo exhibition of 24 works in Santiago; 36 works were shown in Lima. Deffebach 2018, p. 27) (Note: An undated curriculum vitae preserved in her archive gives 1934 as the year she joined LEAR. García de la Cruz 2015, pp. 35–36)

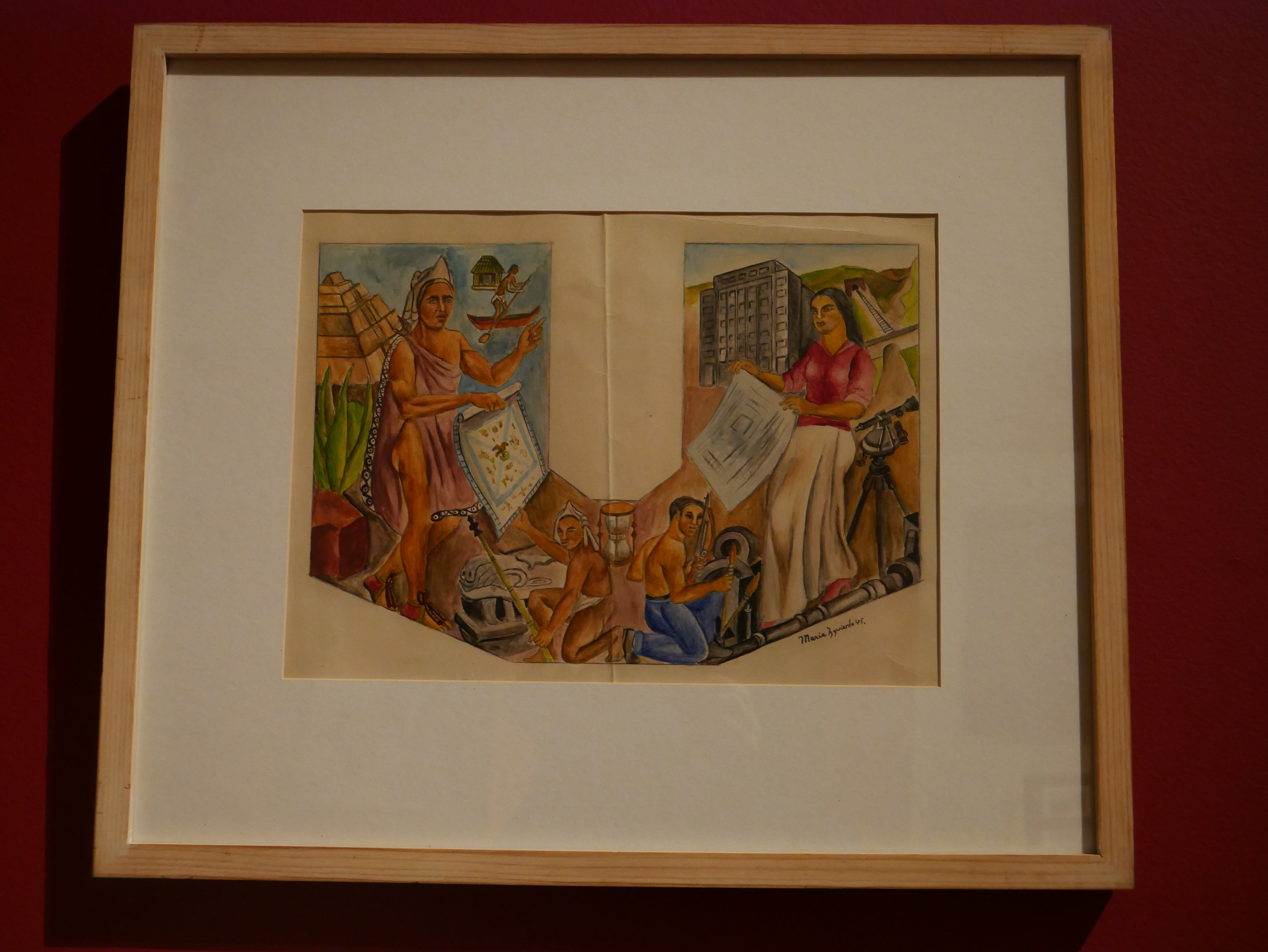
Proyecto para mural (1945), a design for the Federal District Department building, photographed at the Pintar en femenino exhibition.

In 1945, Izquierdo was commissioned to paint murals in the Federal District Department building in Mexico City; although she had signed a contract and her designs had been approved, the commission was revoked following a review meeting attended by Rivera and David Alfaro Siqueiros. She accused both men, along with José Clemente Orozco, of obstructing the project. Her designs combined female figures with scenes of urban modernization and motifs drawn from Mexican traditions. After publicly contesting the decision, Izquierdo painted two portable mural panels, La tragedia and La música; she exhibited them in 1946 as a demonstration of her technical ability. (Note: Accounts disagree on the materials used for the two panels: Hernández Jiménez describes tempera on cement, Deffebach describes fresco, and Serrano Migallón describes oil on canvas. Hernández Jiménez documents their exhibition from May 22 to June 30, 1946, although the captions in her study date the works to 1945. Hernández Jiménez 2015, pp. 495–498 Deffebach 2018, p. 29 Fernando Serrano Migallón (July 25, 2022). "Los murales de la Facultad de Derecho". Gaceta UNAM (in Spanish).) (Note: The two paintings belong to the Instituto Nacional de Bellas Artes y Literatura (INBAL) and are documented on loan to the Ius Semper Loquitur Auditorium of the Faculty of Law at the National Autonomous University of Mexico. Fernando Serrano Migallón (July 25, 2022). "Los murales de la Facultad de Derecho". Gaceta UNAM (in Spanish).)

=== Later years ===
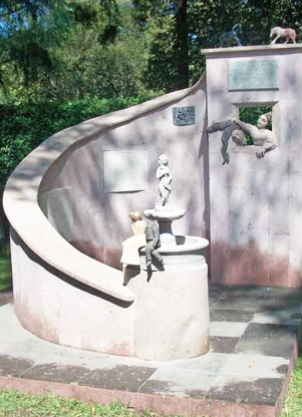
Izquierdo's tomb at the Rotunda of Illustrious Persons in Mexico City's Panteón de Dolores.

A stroke in February 1948 impaired Izquierdo's speech and movement on the right side of her body; she nevertheless continued painting, supporting her right hand with her left. A second stroke in 1952 further limited her work; in 1953, she divorced Raúl Uribe.

Izquierdo died in Mexico City on December 2, 1955; her remains were transferred in 2012 to the Rotunda of Illustrious Persons at the Panteón de Dolores. (Note: The interment ceremony took place on November 22, 2012. Fabiola Martínez (November 23, 2012). "Ingresan cuatro mexicanos excepcionales a la Rotonda de las Personas Ilustres". La Jornada (in Spanish): 21. "Sepulcro de María Izquierdo, ficha I-09-00110". Catálogo Nacional de Monumentos Históricos Inmuebles (in Spanish). Instituto Nacional de Antropología e Historia.)

== Art ==
=== Style ===
Although critics have sometimes associated Izquierdo with Surrealism, she did not join that movement, nor did she follow the political and monumental program of the Mexican muralists; initially, she shared the Contemporáneos' conception of art as an autonomous practice. After 1939, she gave greater prominence to Mexican folk objects, festivals and traditions without abandoning formal experimentation. Her vivid colors, emphatic outlines and unexpected juxtapositions of people and objects prompted comparisons with Surrealist painting.

Izquierdo worked chiefly in oil, watercolor and gouache, depicting still lifes, portraits, landscapes, nudes, horses and circus scenes; she drew both on European painting and on personal memories, Mexican devotional art and handicrafts.

=== Subject matter and iconography ===
Alacena (1947), photographed at the Museo Nacional de Arte, Mexico City.

Izquierdo's still lifes and domestic scenes frequently feature cupboards, toys, fruit, flowers, household altars and votive offerings; her circus paintings depict acrobats, animals and popular entertainers. From 1932 onward, she devoted more than fifty works to the circus, often portraying female acrobats, tightrope walkers and animal trainers with courage, strength and skill, qualities that Mexican muralism generally associated with male heroes. In her self-portraits, she frequently wears Mexican clothing and ornaments; scholars have related these images and other subjects in her work to childhood memories, Catholic devotion and her conception of national identity. She also painted from memory rather than attempting to reproduce her subjects exactly.

In Mujer con espejo (1934), she depicted a nude woman absorbed in her reflection, challenging the convention of the female figure as a passive subject. El baile del oso I (1940) returned to the world of itinerant popular entertainment. By contrast, Niñas durmiendo (1930) depicts two sleeping girls in a domestic setting. (Note: Kathy Celeste Celis Arjona identifies the girls as Izquierdo's daughter Amparo and a niece. A later account in Gaceta UNAM discusses images of her daughters Amparo and Aurora asleep, but does not conclusively identify the sitters in this particular painting. Kathy Celeste Celis Arjona (2018). "Introducción a la Vida y Obra de María Izquierdo" (PDF). Vita et Tempus (in Spanish) (5): 70. Sandra Zetina (December 1, 2025). "La familia como construcción visual, testimonio de fuerza y potencia de la vida". Gaceta UNAM (in Spanish).)

Izquierdo's portrayals of women in varied roles and settings challenged the subordinate position often assigned to them in official muralist imagery; scholars have also interpreted her family scenes and allegories of work and freedom in this context.

=== Works of the 1940s and 1950s ===
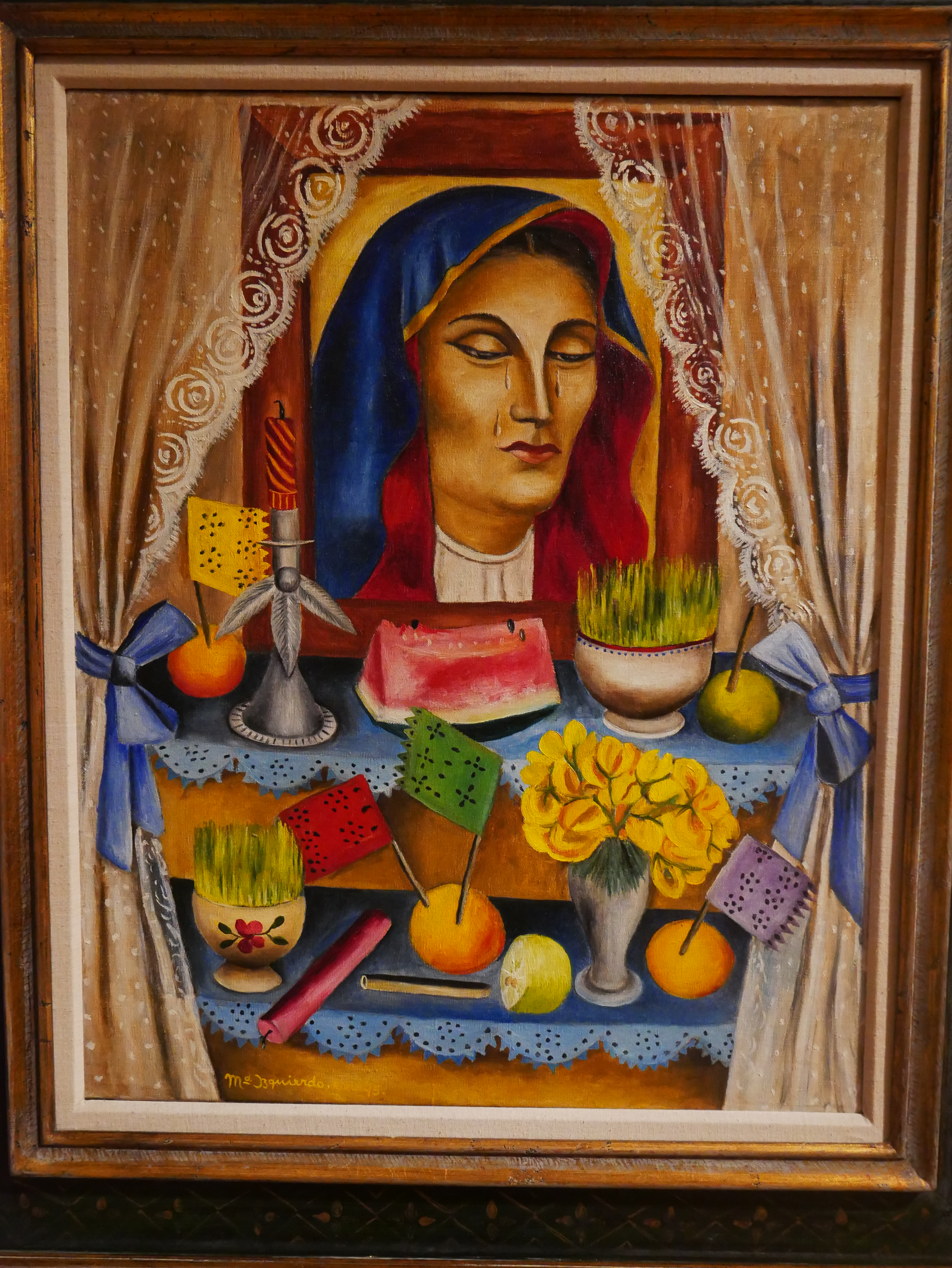
Viernes de Dolores (1944–1945), photographed at the Pintar en femenino exhibition.

Between 1940 and 1948, Izquierdo painted at least twelve ofrendas, drawing on Mexican Catholic domestic altars and religious observances; in Viernes de Dolores, as in other works in the series, shelves and cupboards are adorned with papel picado, pottery, fruit, flowers, candles and toys. Motifs found in Trigo crecido (1940) and Alacena (1942) reappear in Alacena, Viernes de juguetería (1952).

In Zapata (1945), the revolutionary is absent; two horses beside a tomb evoke his death. Naturaleza viva con huachinango (1946) juxtaposes an abundance of food with an arid landscape, departing from the muralists' celebratory subjects. In Sueño y presentimiento (1947), Izquierdo depicted herself at a window holding her severed head by its hair; the strands entwine with tree branches from which two masks hang, while distant figures flee. Critics have interpreted the dreamlike composition in relation to the artist's concerns during her later years.

== Views on feminism ==
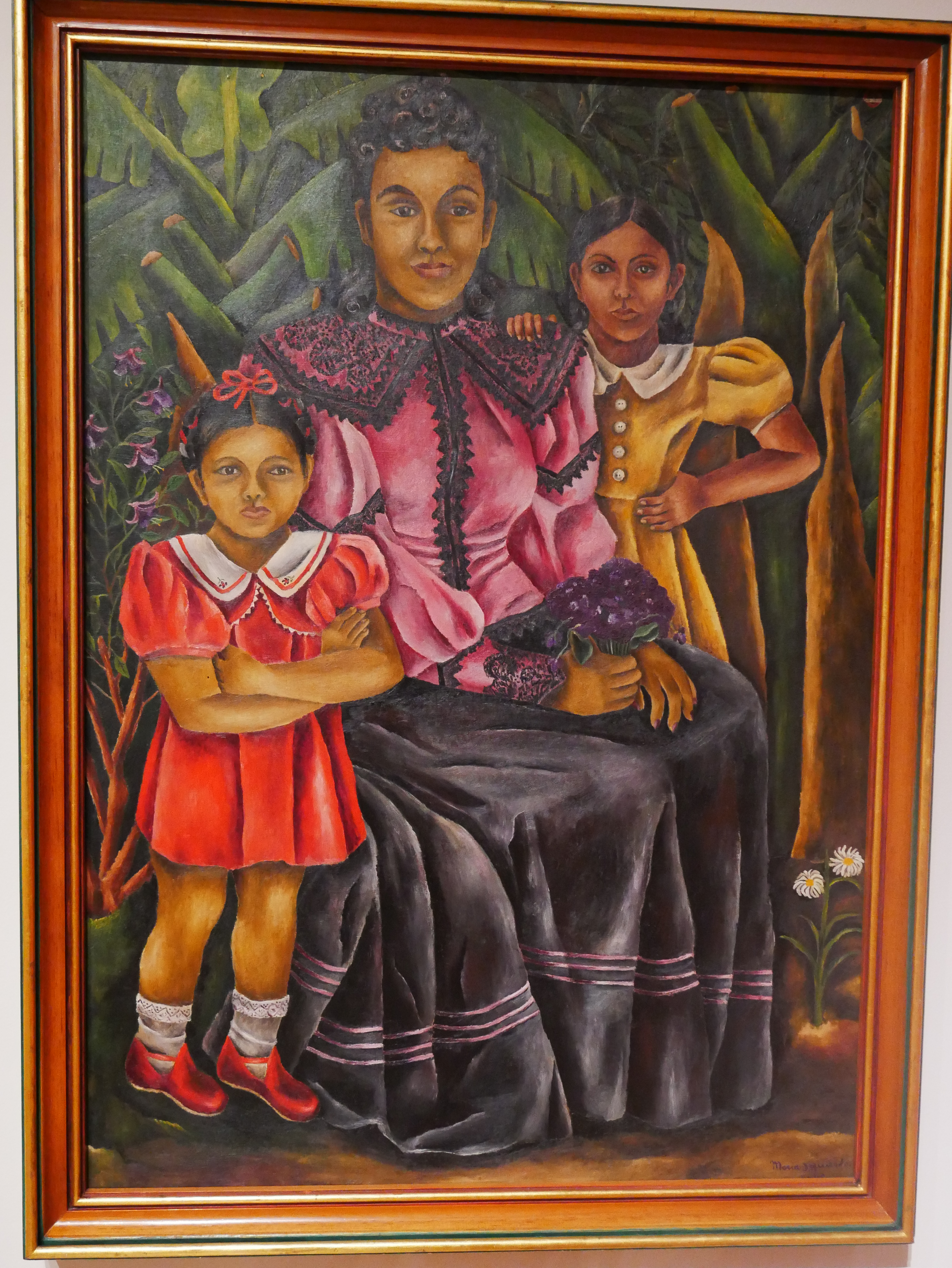
Mis sobrinas (1940), from the Museo Nacional de Arte collection, photographed at the Pintar en femenino exhibition.

Although Izquierdo did not identify as a feminist, she defended women's access to education and professional recognition; in her lecture La mujer y el arte mexicano, she criticized certain feminist currents while arguing that women's historical exclusion from education and intellectual life helped explain their limited representation in the arts. Her 1950 Carta a las mujeres de México likewise defended women's freedom, while retaining a traditional conception of marriage. (Note: The date of the lecture is disputed. The Los Angeles County Museum of Art checklist (2012, p. 23) and Moctezuma and Nahón (2024, p. 317) give July 1934; Martín Navarrete (2014, p. 20, note 76) gives July 1939. After examining the typescript, Deffebach (2015, p. 167) noted that the 1934 date was not written by Izquierdo and suggested 1944: the document is signed "María Izquierdo de Uribe", and she married Raúl Uribe on May 31, 1944. The 1944 dating remains a hypothesis. "In Wonderland: The Surrealist Adventures of Women Artists in Mexico and the United States. Checklist" (PDF). 2012. p. 23. Moctezuma & Nahón 2024, p. 317 Martín Navarrete 2014, p. 20 Deffebach 2015, p. 167)

In 1935, Izquierdo directed the women's visual arts section at the Secretaría de Educación Pública and worked with photographer Lola Álvarez Bravo to organize an exhibition of revolutionary posters in Mexico City and Guadalajara. Asked about women's role in the revolutionary struggle, Izquierdo urged them to reject the status of "luxury objects" and participate in political life. In 1939, she joined the executive committee of the Sociedad Panamericana de Mujeres; by 1944, she chaired the organizing committee for a proposed international congress of anti-fascist artists and writers. (Note: In a typewritten letter dated January 25, 1944, Izquierdo identified herself as president of the proposed congress and requested support for it. García de la Cruz 2015, p. 56) Following the revocation of her mural commission in 1945, she challenged the influence of the three leading muralists; she returned to the dispute in a 1947 article that also criticized Rufino Tamayo. (Note: Asked by a journalist in 1935 about women's role in social struggle, she urged women to stop being regarded as "luxury objects" and to take an active part in the revolutionary movement. Deffebach 2015, p. 167)

Scholars have interpreted El alhajero in relation to changing gender roles and Alegoría del trabajo as a possible allegory of women's exploitation. Sandra Zetina has examined family relationships in Mis sobrinas (1940). (Note: The adult sitter in Mis sobrinas has not been conclusively identified. Although the painting has sometimes been viewed as a self-portrait, Sandra Zetina also proposed Izquierdo's half-sister Belem Valdés Gutiérrez as the subject. Sandra Zetina (December 1, 2025). "La familia como construcción visual, testimonio de fuerza y potencia de la vida". Gaceta UNAM (in Spanish).)

== Critical reception ==
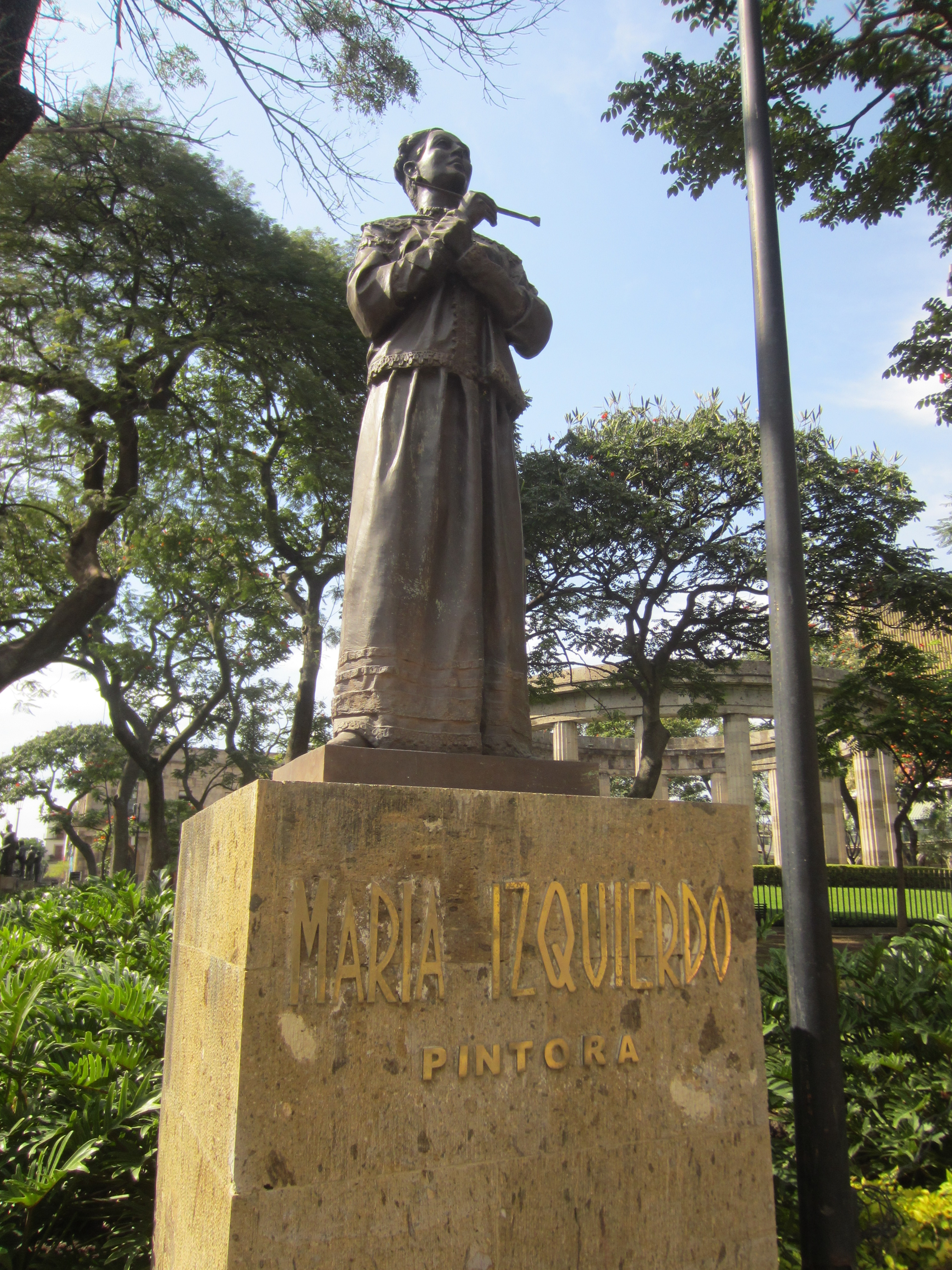
Monument to María Izquierdo in Guadalajara, Jalisco.

Art historians have examined Izquierdo's relationship to Mexican muralism, her treatment of everyday and popular subjects, and her representations of women, distinguishing her approach from that of Frida Kahlo. In 1937, Antonin Artaud described her paintings as "primitive" and unsettling and helped arrange her first European exhibition, although Izquierdo did not join the Surrealist movement.

The Centro Cultural/Arte Contemporáneo in Mexico City mounted a retrospective of Izquierdo's work from November 1988 to February 1989.

The Museo de Arte Moderno has housed the Fondo María Izquierdo since 2005; the archive contains photographs, correspondence, press clippings and exhibition documents, many gathered by Izquierdo herself. In 2013, the museum presented a selection from the archive in an exhibition and a catalogue titled Archivo María Izquierdo del Museo de Arte Moderno.

== Impact ==
Izquierdo's work has drawn attention to the position of women in twentieth-century Mexican art. Art historian Nancy Deffebach notes that, while women often occupied supporting roles in the work of the Mexican muralists, they frequently appear as protagonists in Izquierdo's paintings. Her career also exposed obstacles faced by women painters: art historian Luis-Martín Lozano has discussed the withdrawal of her 1945 public mural commission despite her professional experience and the earlier recognition of her work.

Her paintings have continued to be exhibited internationally. In 2024, the Venice Biennale included her Autorretrato (1947), marking the first presentation of her work at the event.

== Selected works ==
Paisaje con piña (1953), Museo de Arte Moderno, Mexico City.

- Naturaleza muerta (con cepillo de dientes), c. 1928; Museo de Arte Moderno, Mexico City
- Retrato de Belem, 1928; Andrés Blaisten Collection (Note: The Andrés Blaisten Collection is privately owned; part of it was exhibited in Tlatelolco between 2007 and 2012. "Acerca de la Colección Blaisten". Colección Andrés Blaisten (in Spanish).)
- La Sopera, 1929; Andrés Blaisten Collection
- El teléfono, 1931; Andrés Blaisten Collection
- Hombre con caballo, 1932; Andrés Blaisten Collection
- Naturaleza muerta, 1932; Andrés Blaisten Collection
- El domador, 1932; Andrés Blaisten Collection
- Calvario, 1933; Andrés Blaisten Collection
- Alegoría del trabajo, 1936; Andrés Blaisten Collection
- Alegoría de la libertad, 1937; Andrés Blaisten Collection
- La raqueta, 1938; Andrés Blaisten Collection
- Autorretrato, 1939; Club de Industriales collection
- Caracoles, 1939; Andrés Blaisten Collection
- Retrato de Juan Soriano, 1939; Andrés Blaisten Collection
- Ensayo de ballet, 1939
- El circo, 1939; Banco Nacional de México collection
- El mantel rojo, 1940; Andrés Blaisten Collection
- El ronzal azul V, 1940; Andrés Blaisten Collection (MI051)
- Estación tropical, 1940; Andrés Blaisten Collection
- Escena de circo, 1940; Andrés Blaisten Collection
- El baile del oso I, 1940
- Autorretrato, 1940; Andrés Blaisten Collection (MI060)
- Caballos amorosos, 1940; Andrés Blaisten Collection (MI061)
- Mi tía, 1940; Museo Nacional de Arte (MUNAL), Mexico City
- Mis sobrinas, 1940; Museo Nacional de Arte (MUNAL), Mexico City
- La carreta, 1940; Pascual Gutiérrez Roldón collection, Mexico City
- Trigo crecido, 1940; private collection (Note: The 1993 and 1995–1996 exhibition catalogues mention the Galería de Arte Mexicano in their provenance and loan credits.)
- Retrato de María Asúnsolo, 1941; Andrés Blaisten Collection (Note: INBAL records a painting with the same title, dated 1942, at the Museo Nacional de Arte (MUNAL) in Mexico City, whereas the Blaisten Collection catalogues one dated 1941. "María Izquierdo representó en parte de su obra el arte circense y sus personajes". Instituto Nacional de Bellas Artes y Literatura (in Spanish). December 1, 2020.)
- Niña con sombrero rojo, 1942; SURA México Collection
- Alacena, 1942; FEMSA Collection
- El alhajero, 1942; Banco Nacional de México collection (Note: The National Museum of Mexican Art dates the work to 1942 in its 1995–1996 retrospective material; Jimena Zambrano (2015) gives 1941. "María Izquierdo: 1902–1955". Jimena Zambrano (2015). "Transformando al ángel: la mujer-artista en Las siete cabritas de Elena Poniatowska". Revista Laboratorio (in Spanish) (12). doi:10.32995/rl12201548.)
- Mi tía, un amiguito y yo, 1942; Andrés Blaisten Collection
- El huachinango, 1943
- Troje, 1943; Andrés Blaisten Collection
- Orquídeas, 1944; Andrés Blaisten Collection
- Maternidad, 1944; private collection (Note: Liliana Padilla reproduces the painting under the French title Maternité (1944), identifying it as an oil on canvas measuring 85 × 70.2 cm in a private collection. Liliana Padilla (2018). "María Izquierdo". Archives of Women Artists, Research and Exhibitions (AWARE).)
- Viernes de Dolores, 1944–1945; Andrés Blaisten Collection
- Coscomates, 1945; Andrés Blaisten Collection
- Retrato de Edmé Moya, 1945; Andrés Blaisten Collection
- Zapata, 1945; Andrés Blaisten Collection
- Payaso, 1945; Andrés Blaisten Collection (MI057)
- La tierra, 1945; Andrés Blaisten Collection (MI007)
- Naturaleza muerta con huachinangos, 1946
- Niñas con sandía, 1946; SURA México Collection
- Llamas de Machu Pichu, 1946; Andrés Blaisten Collection
- La tragedia, 1946; INBAL collection, on loan to the Faculty of Law of UNAM, Mexico City
- La música, 1946; INBAL collection, on loan to the Faculty of Law of UNAM, Mexico City
- Caballos en el río, 1946; Andrés Blaisten Collection
- El idilio, 1946; Andrés Blaisten Collection
- Alacena con dulces cubiertos, 1946; César Montemayor Zambrano collection, Monterrey
- Autorretrato, 1946; private collection
- La niña indiferente, 1947; private collection (Note: The 1995–1996 exhibition catalogue names the Galería de Arte Mexicano and the collections of Mariana Pérez Amor and Alejandra R. de Yturbe in its loan and provenance credits.)
- Autorretrato, 1947; Andrés Blaisten Collection (Note: The 1993 MoMA exhibition catalogue records another Autorretrato dated 1947, measuring 92 × 73 cm, then in the Club de Industriales collection; it is distinct from the 55 × 45 cm work in the Blaisten Collection. The Museum of Modern Art (1993). Latin American Artists of the Twentieth Century: Master Checklist (PDF) (Report). p. 12.)
- Alacena, 1947; Andrés Blaisten Collection
- La soga, 1947; Andrés Blaisten Collection
- Sueño y presentimiento, 1947; private collection (Note: The 1993 MoMA checklist placed the work in a private collection.)
- Dolorosa con trigo, 1948
- Infancia del país, 1952
- Alacena, Viernes de juguetería, 1952; Museo Nacional de Arte (MUNAL), Mexico City
- Paisaje con piña, 1953; Museo de Arte Moderno, Mexico City
- Alacena con paloma, 1954; SURA México Collection
- Caballos, 1954
- Escena del circo, 1954
- Hacia el paraíso, 1954

== Bibliography ==
=== Sources ===
- Deffebach, Nancy (2015). María Izquierdo and Frida Kahlo: Challenging Visions in Modern Mexican Art. Austin: University of Texas Press. doi:10.7560/772427. ISBN 978-0-292-77242-7.
- Deffebach, Nancy (2018). "María Izquierdo: arte puro y mexicanidad" (PDF). Co-herencia (in Spanish). 15 (29): 13–36. doi:10.17230/co-herencia.15.29.1.
- García de la Cruz, Aura Guadalupe (2015). Zapata en el pincel de María Izquierdo: un homenaje íntimo (PDF) (Master's thesis) (in Spanish). Universidad Nacional Autónoma de México.
- Geis, Terri (2005). "The voyaging reality: María Izquierdo and Antonin Artaud, Mexico and Paris" (PDF). Papers of Surrealism (4): 1–12.
- Hernández Jiménez, Gloria (2015). "Tragedia y Música: los avatares de la creación y la figura femenina en la obra de María Izquierdo". Crónicas. El Muralismo, Producto de la Revolución Mexicana, en América (in Spanish) (Special issue). Universidad Nacional Autónoma de México: 489–505.
- Martín Navarrete, María del Carmen (2014). Lo que no pudo ser: María Izquierdo y su intento fallido por incursionar en el muralismo en 1945 (PDF) (Master's thesis) (in Spanish). Universidad Nacional Autónoma de México.
- Moctezuma, Liliana Elvira; Nahón, Abraham (2024). "Imágenes, archivo y memoria: digitalización de la obra de la artista María Izquierdo" (PDF). InMediaciones de la Comunicación (in Spanish). 19 (2): 307–327. doi:10.18861/ic.2024.19.2.3770.

=== Further reading ===
- Ferrer, Elizabeth, ed. (1997). The True Poetry: The Art of María Izquierdo. New York: Americas Society. ISBN 1-879128-15-2.
- Greeley, Robin Adèle (2000). "Painting Mexican Identities: Nationalism and Gender in the Work of María Izquierdo". Oxford Art Journal. 23 (1): 51–71. doi:10.1093/oxartj/23.1.51.

== See also ==
- Frida Kahlo
- Leonora Carrington
- Remedios Varo
- Statue of María Izquierdo
