= Statue of Jorge Matute Remus (Rotonda de los Jaliscienses Ilustres) =

Statue in Guadalajara, Jalisco, Mexico

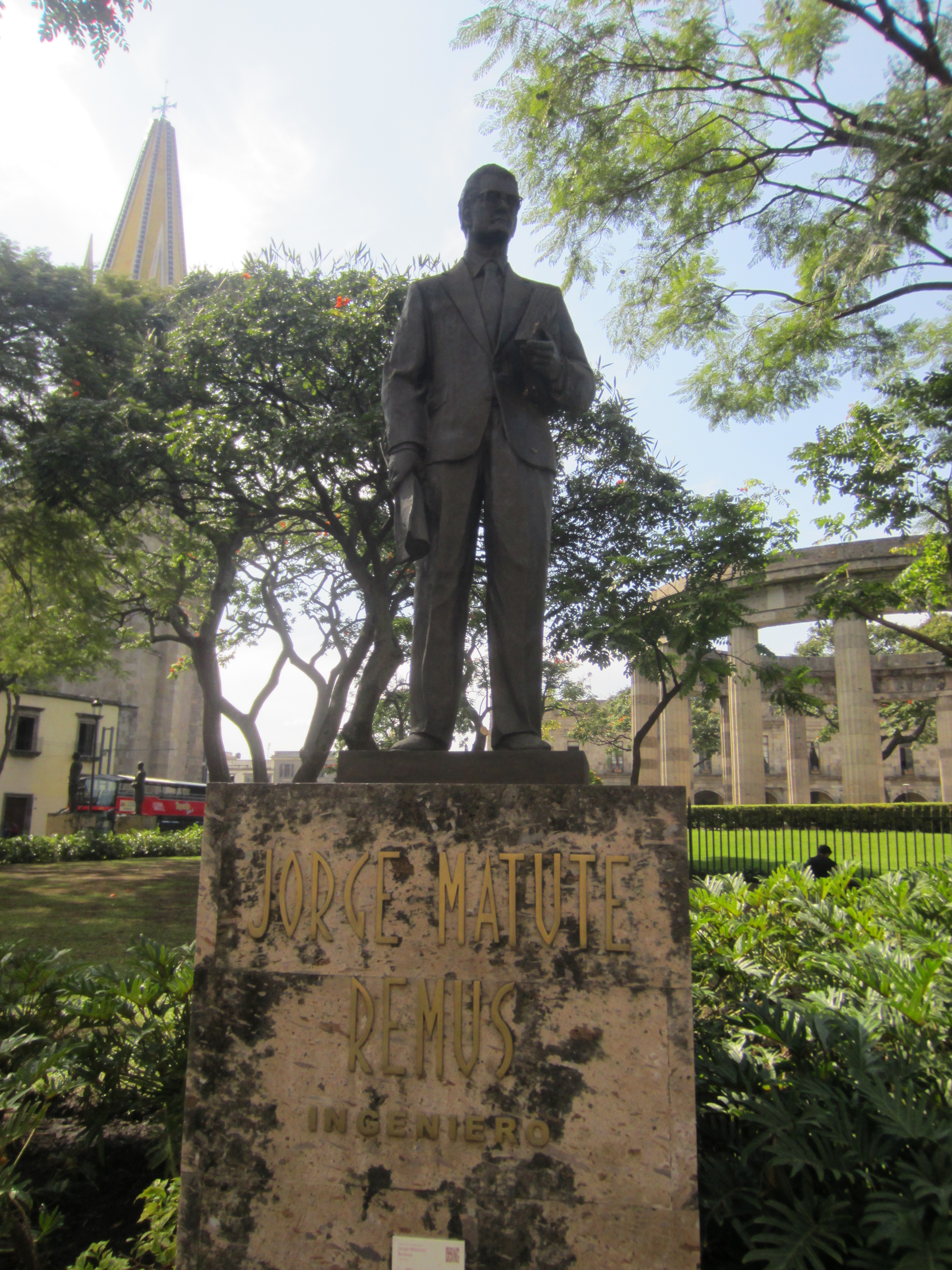
- The statue in 2021
- Subject: Jorge Matute Remus
- Location: Guadalajara, Jalisco, Mexico; 20°40′39.5″N 103°20′48″W

A statue of Jorge Matute Remus is installed along the Rotonda de los Jaliscienses Ilustres, in Centro, Guadalajara, in the Mexican state of Jalisco.
