= Las Tres Gracias =

Sculptural group by Sergio Garval in Guadalajara, Jalisco, Mexico

- Artist: Sergio Garval
- Location: Guadalajara, Jalisco, Mexico
- Coordinates: 20°37′37″N 103°19′50″W

Las Tres Gracias (English: "The Three Graces") is a sculptural group by Sergio Garval, installed in Guadalajara, in the Mexican state of Jalisco.
