= Fuente Olímpica =

Fountain and sculpture in Guadalajara, Jalisco, Mexico

- Location: Guadalajara, Jalisco, Mexico; 20°41′18.9″N 103°20′4.6″W

Fuente Olímpica is a fountain and sculpture in Guadalajara, in the Mexican state of Jalisco.
