= Statue of Manuel M. Diéguez =

Statue in Guadalajara, Jalisco, Mexico

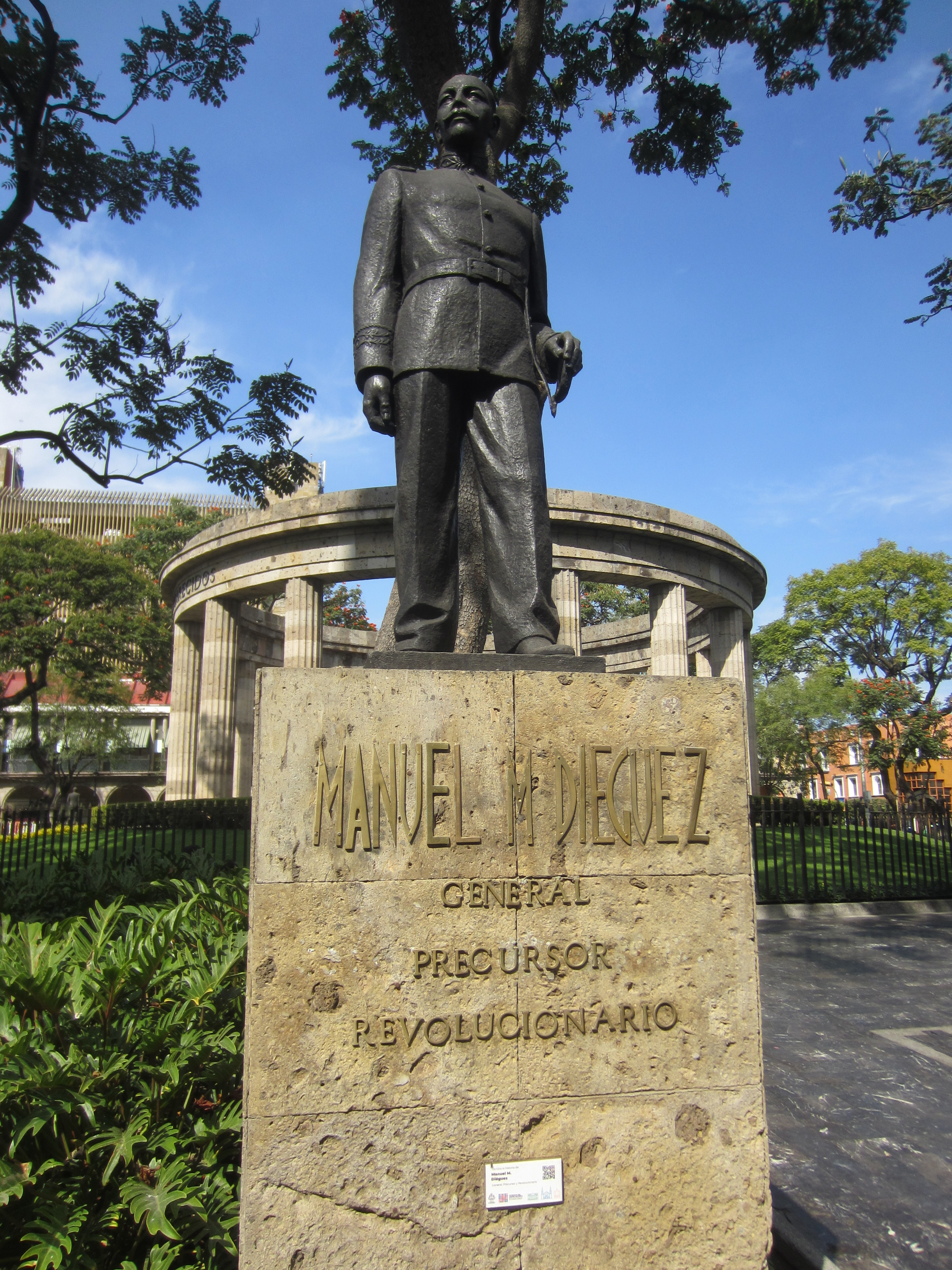
- The statue in 2021
- Subject: Manuel M. Diéguez
- Location: Guadalajara, Jalisco, Mexico; 20°40′39″N 103°20′49.5″W

A statue of Manuel M. Diéguez is installed along the Rotonda de los Jaliscienses Ilustres, in Centro, Guadalajara, in the Mexican state of Jalisco.
