= Statue of Francisco Silva Romero =

Statue in Guadalajara, Jalisco, Mexico

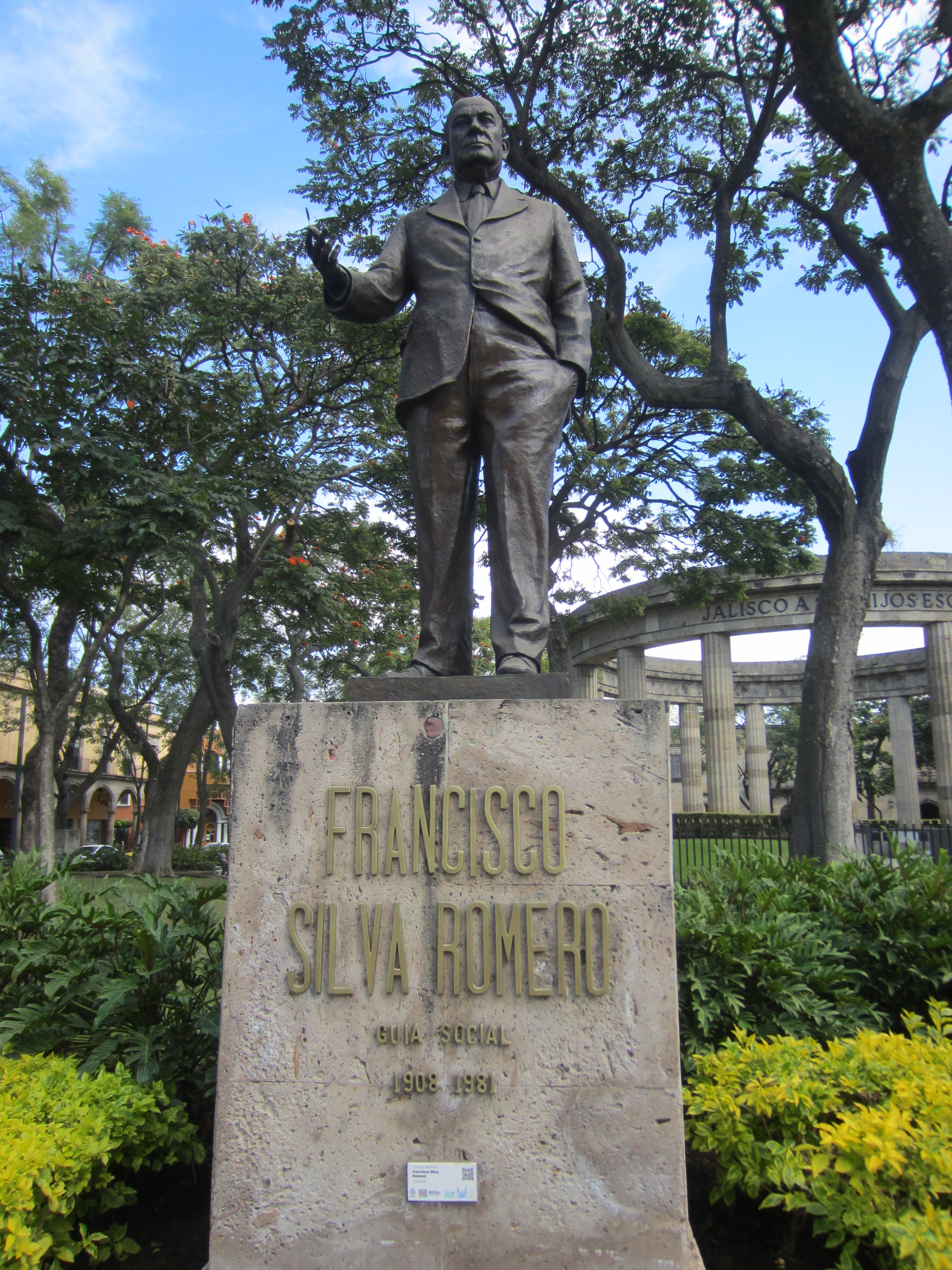
- The sculpture in 2021
- Subject: Francisco Silva Romero
- Location: Guadalajara, Jalisco, Mexico; 20°40′40.2″N 103°20′50.5″W

A statue of Francisco Silva Romero is installed along the Rotonda de los Jaliscienses Ilustres, in Centro, Guadalajara, in the Mexican state of Jalisco.
