= Statue of Luis Pérez Verdía =

Statue in Guadalajara, Jalisco, Mexico

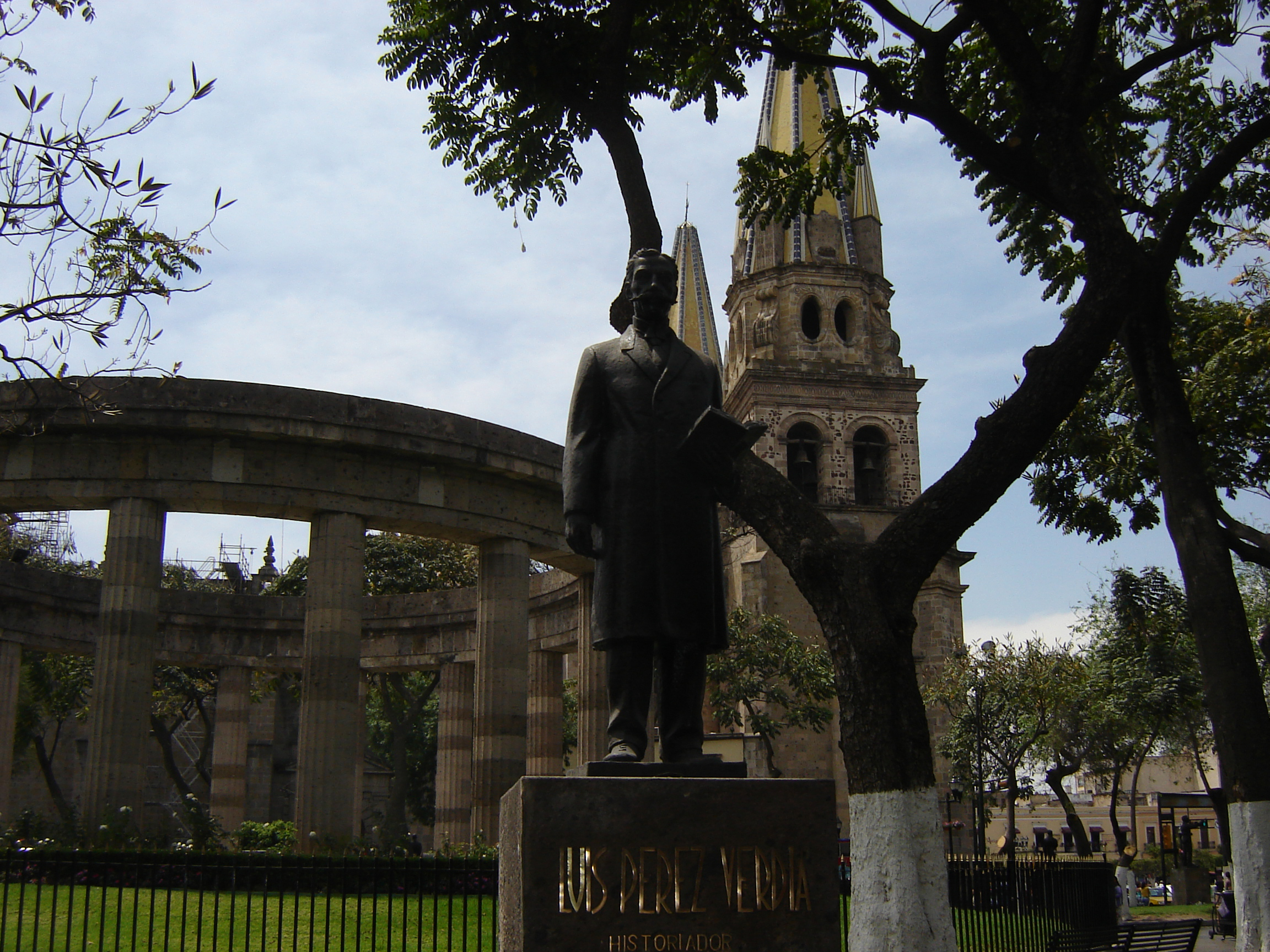
- The statue in 2010
- Subject: Luis Pérez Verdía
- Location: Guadalajara, Jalisco, Mexico; 20°40′41″N 103°20′49.5″W

A statue of Luis Pérez Verdía is installed along the Rotonda de los Jaliscienses Ilustres, in Centro, Guadalajara, in the Mexican state of Jalisco.
