= Statue of Antonio Alcalde Barriga (Rotonda de los Jaliscienses Ilustres) =

Statue in Guadalajara, Jalisco, Mexico

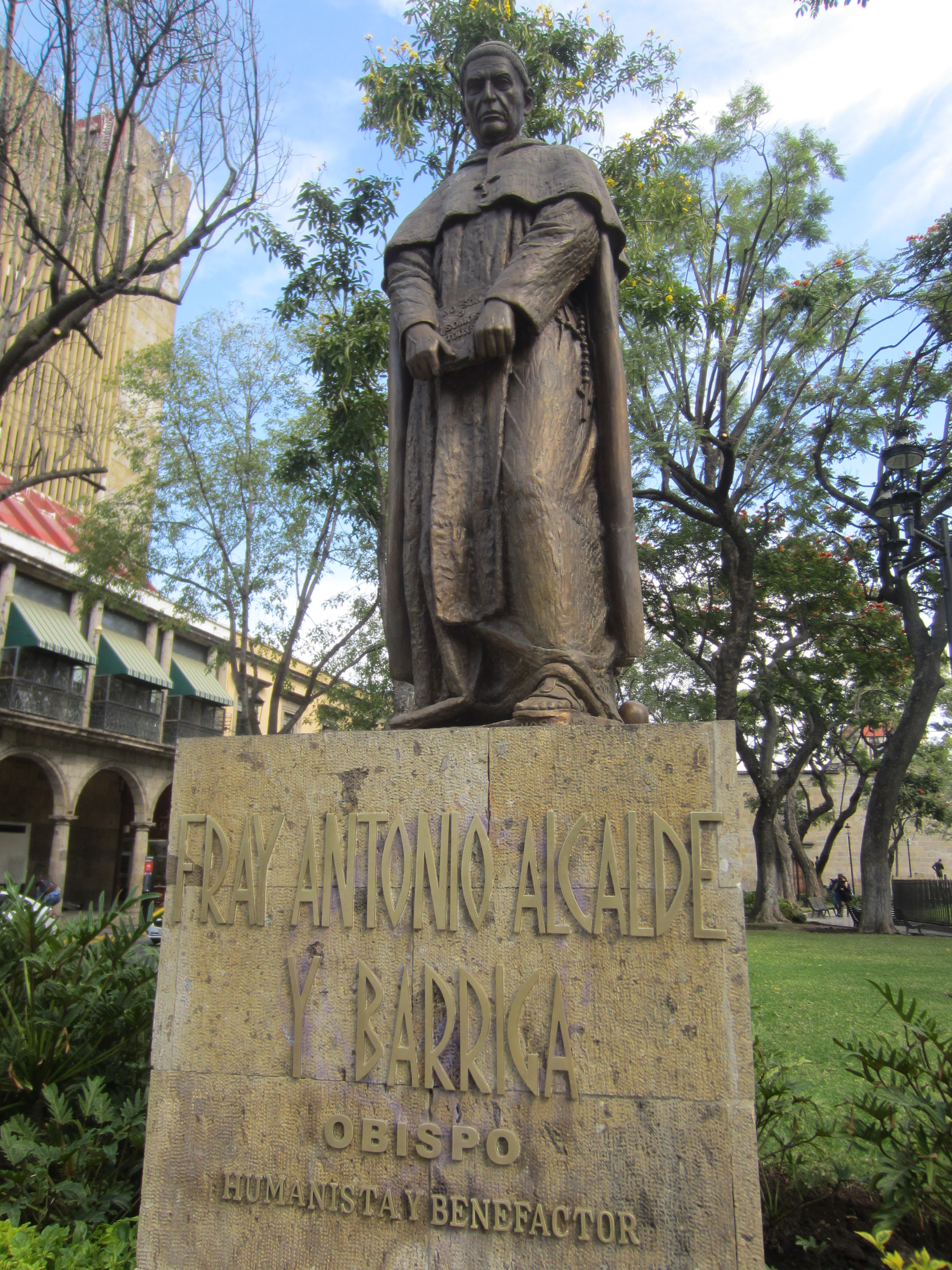
- The statue in 2021
- Subject: Antonio Alcalde Barriga
- Location: Guadalajara, Jalisco, Mexico; 20°40′40.7″N 103°20′50.5″W

A statue of Antonio Alcalde Barriga is installed along the Rotonda de los Jaliscienses Ilustres, in Centro, Guadalajara, in the Mexican state of Jalisco.
