= Statue of José Antonio Torres =

Statue in Guadalajara, Jalisco, Mexico

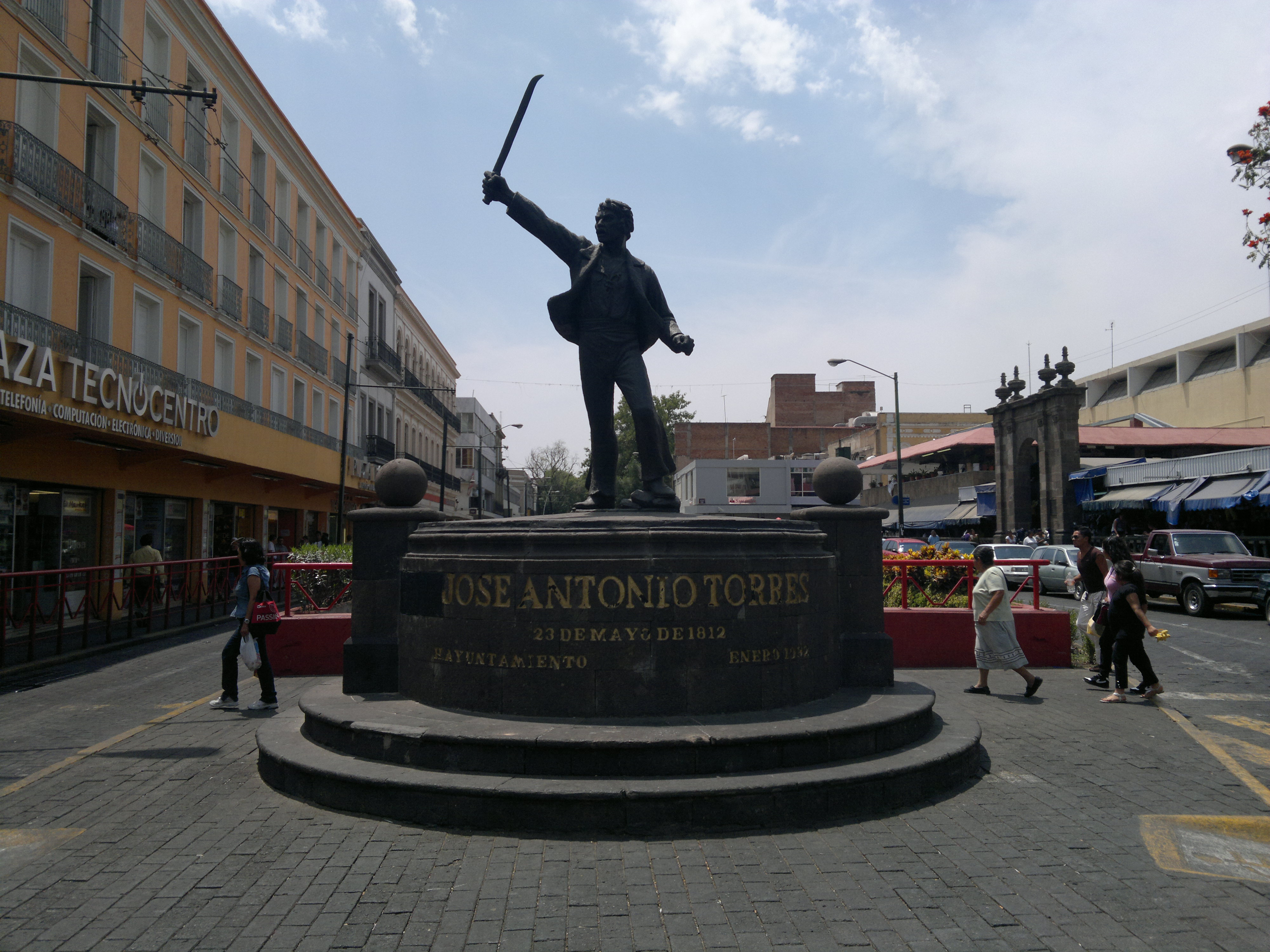
- The statue in 2011
- Artist: José Méndez Hernández
- Subject: José Antonio Torres
- Location: Guadalajara, Jalisco, Mexico; 20°40′38.5″N 103°20′57.8″W

A statue of José Antonio Torres is installed near the Corona Market, in Centro, Guadalajara, in the Mexican state of Jalisco. The statue is 2.5 meters (8 ft 2 in) tall and he is described as having an enraged face. The sculptor was Juan José Méndez Hernández. In April 2017, the machete he was holding was stolen.
