= Statue of Beatriz Hernández =

Statue in Guadalajara, Jalisco, Mexico

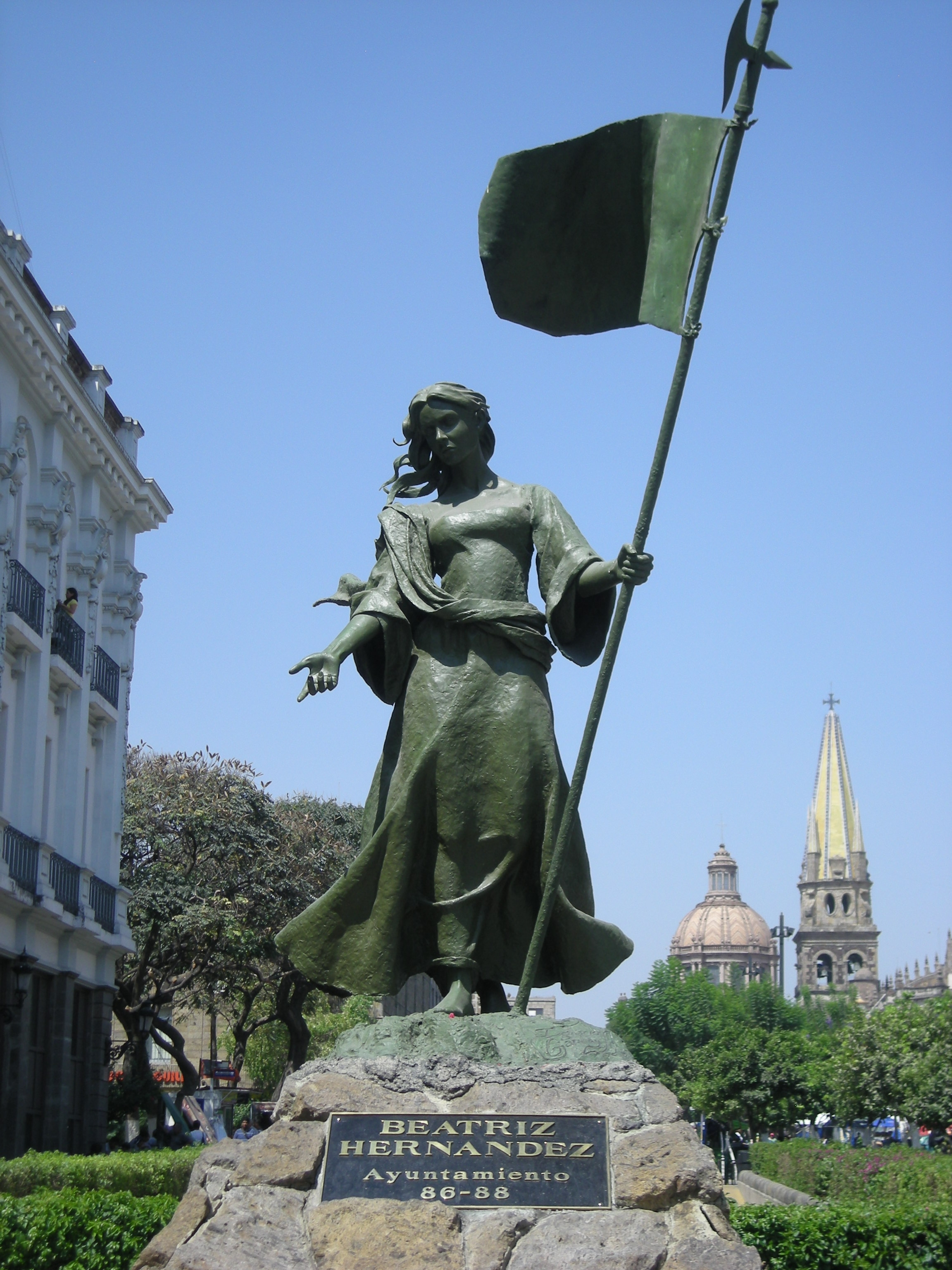
- The statue in 2009
- Location: Guadalajara, Jalisco, Mexico; 20°40′36.2″N 103°20′38.5″W

A statue of Beatriz Hernández is installed in Guadalajara, in the Mexican state of Jalisco.

The plaque beneath her name reads: “A porfía de mujer: La iracunda doña Beatriz Hernández, se hizo el último y definitivo asiento de esta Guadalajara, Doña Beatriz toda resuelta y atrevida gritó: “señores, el Rey es mi gallo, y soy de parecer que nos pasemos a Valle de Atemaxac.” ("A porphyry of a woman: The angry doña Beatriz Hernández, became the last and definitive seat of this Guadalajara, Doña Beatriz all resolute and daring shouted: "gentlemen, the King is my rooster, and I am of the appearance that we move to Valle de Atemaxac.")
