= Statue of Agustín de la Rosa =

Statue in Guadalajara, Jalisco, Mexico

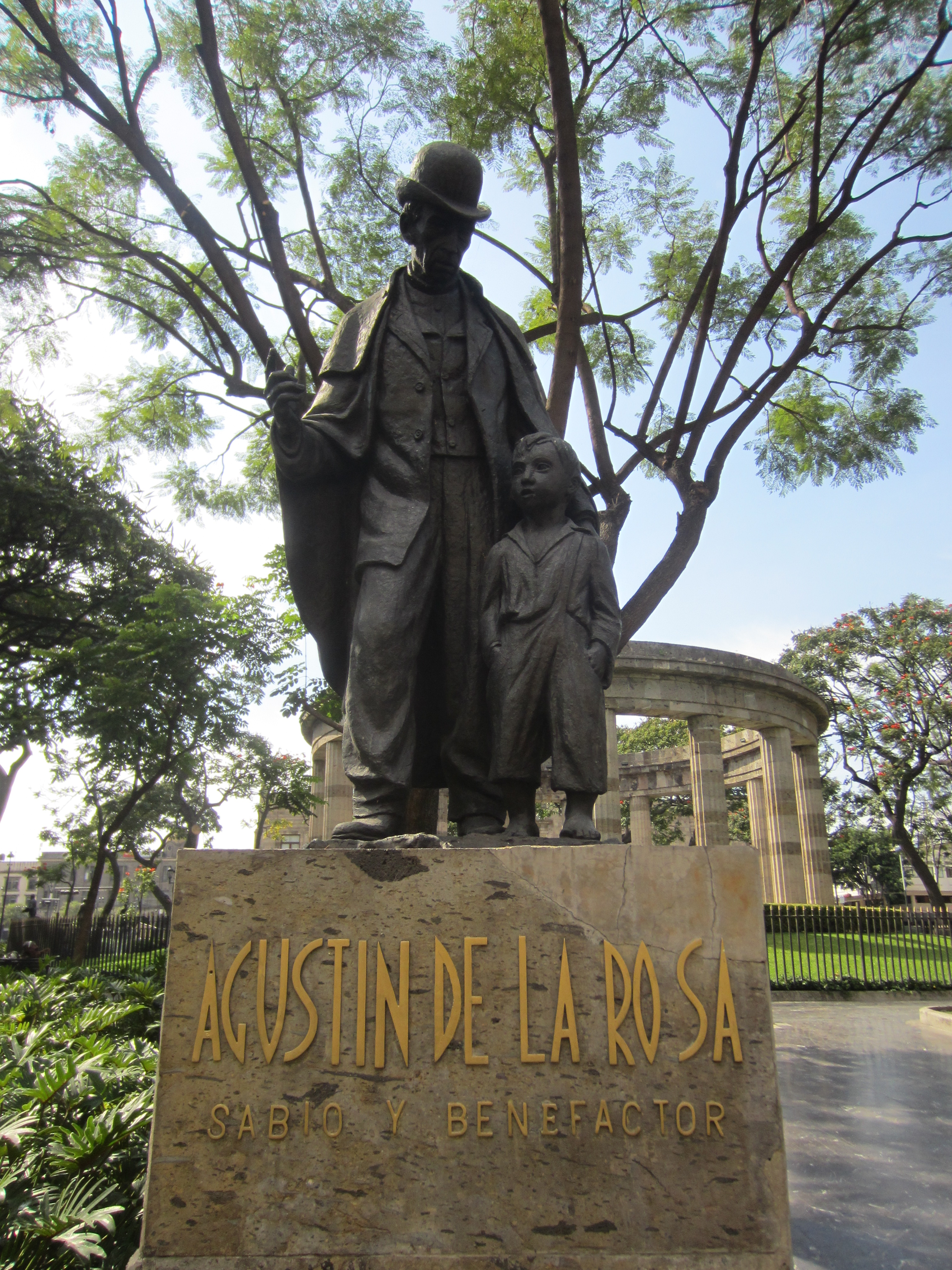
- The statue in 2021
- Location: 20°40′39.9″N 103°20′48″W

A statue of Agustín de la Rosa is installed along the Rotonda de los Jaliscienses Ilustres in Centro, Guadalajara, in the Mexican state of Jalisco.
