= Statue of Valentín Gómez Farías =

Statue in Guadalajara, Jalisco, Mexico

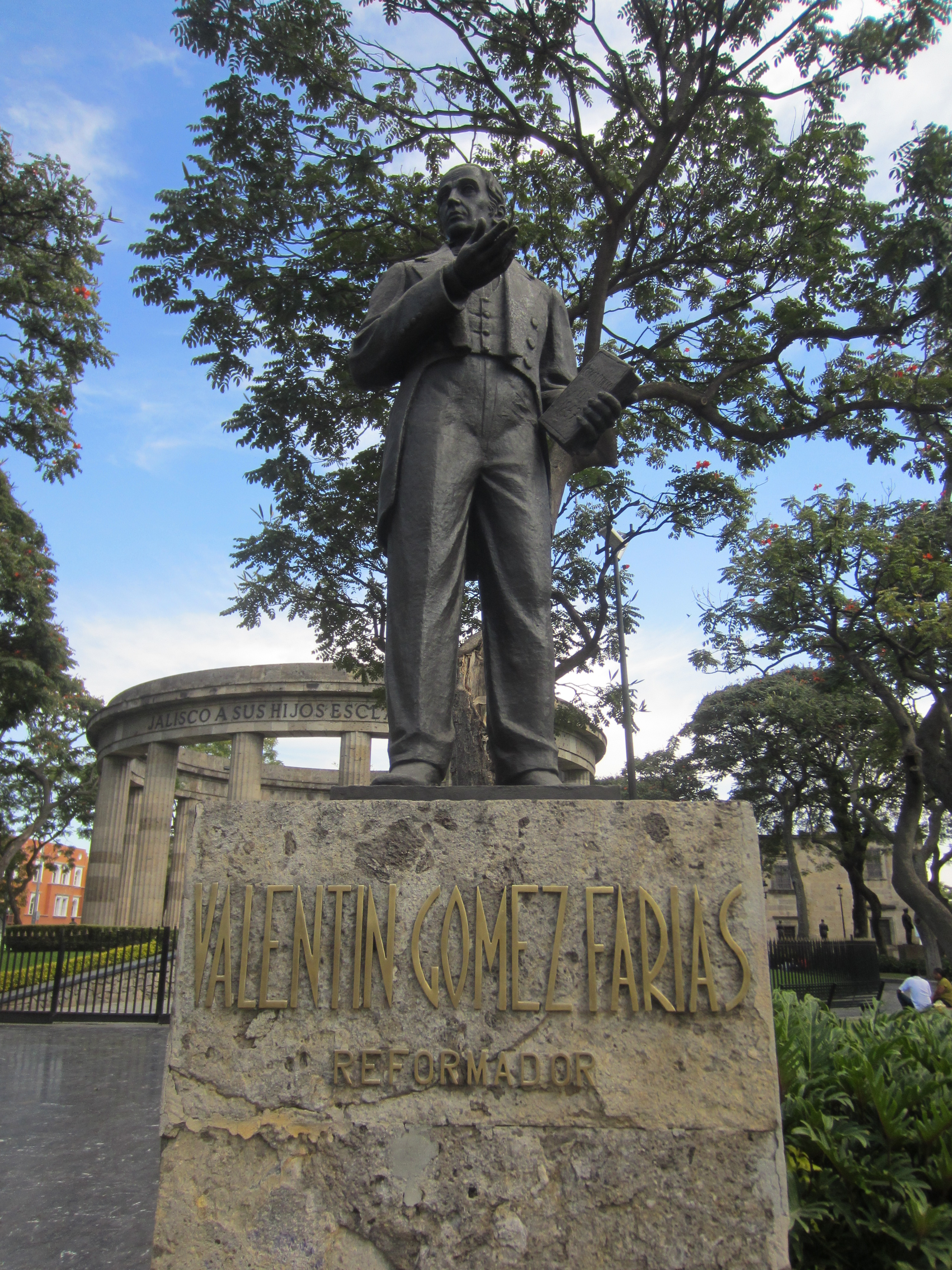
- The statue in 2021
- Subject: Valentín Gómez Farías
- Location: Guadalajara, Jalisco, Mexico; 20°40′39.7″N 103°20′50.4″W

A statue of Valentín Gómez Farías is installed along the Rotonda de los Jaliscienses Ilustres, in Centro, Guadalajara, in the Mexican state of Jalisco.
