= Statue of Jacobo Gálvez =

Statue in Guadalajara, Jalisco, Mexico

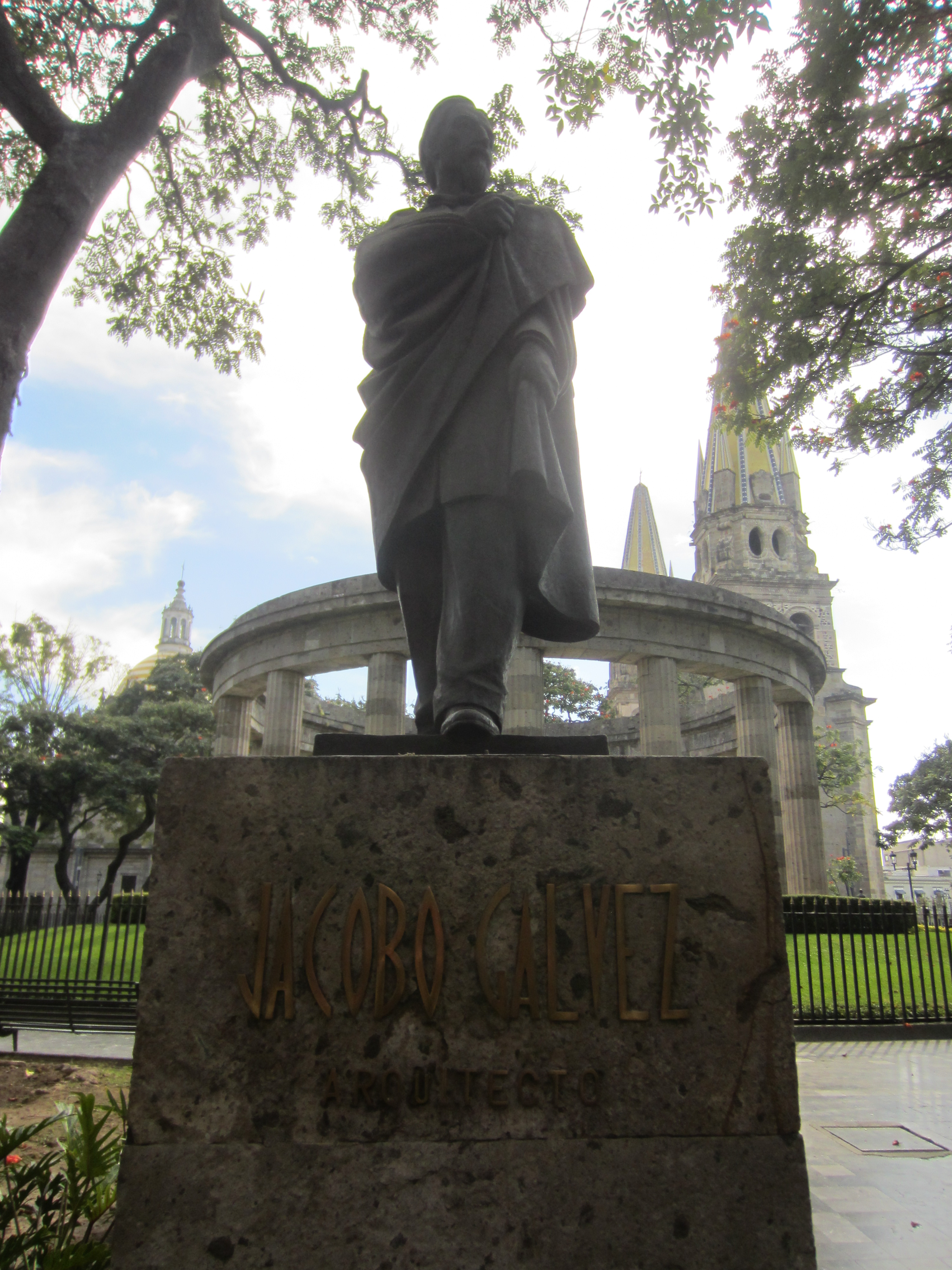
- The statue in 2021
- Subject: Jacobo Gálvez
- Location: Guadalajara, Jalisco, Mexico; 20°40′41″N 103°20′49.2″W

A statue of Jacobo Gálvez is installed along the Rotonda de los Jaliscienses Ilustres, in Centro, Guadalajara, in the Mexican state of Jalisco.
