= Statue of Rafael Preciado Hernández =

Statue in Guadalajara, Jalisco, Mexico

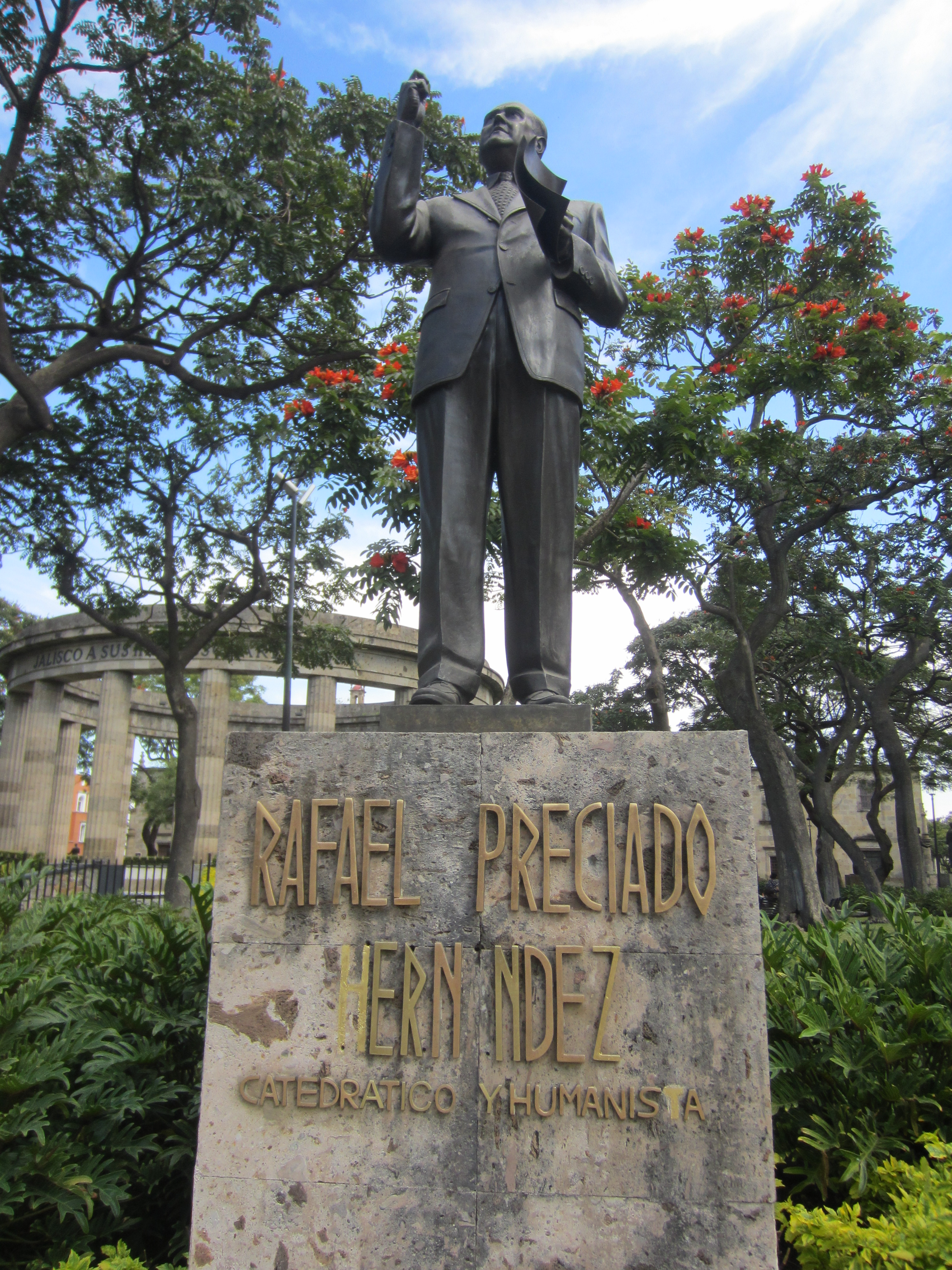
- The statue in 2021
- Subject: Rafael Preciado Hernández
- Location: Guadalajara, Jalisco, Mexico; 20°40′39.5″N 103°20′50.4″W

A statue of Rafael Preciado Hernández is installed along the Rotonda de los Jaliscienses Ilustres, in Centro, Guadalajara, in the Mexican state of Jalisco.
