= Statue of Heliodoro Hernández Loza =

Statue in Guadalajara, Jalisco, Mexico

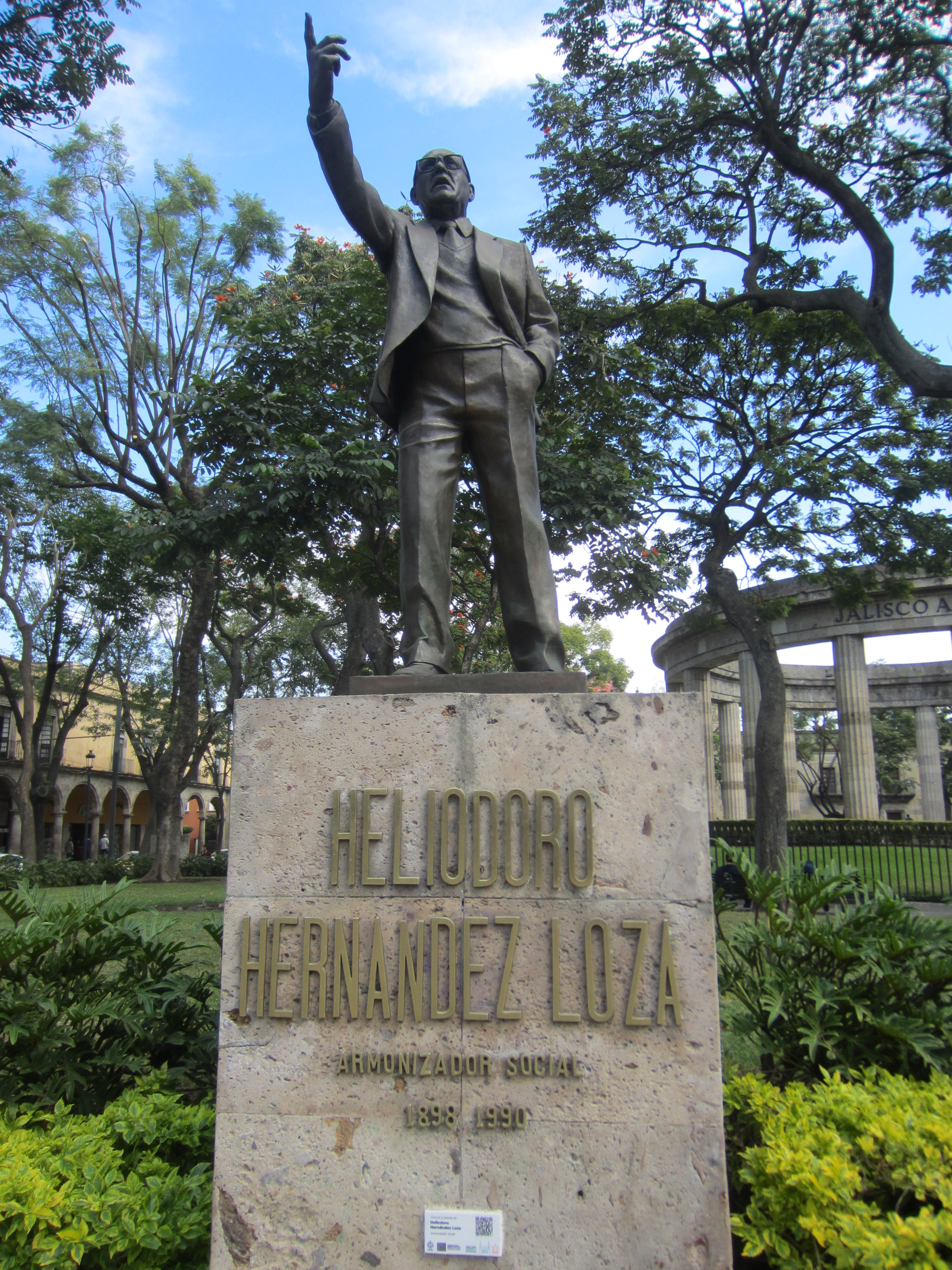
- The statue in 2021
- Subject: Heliodoro Hernández Loza
- Location: Guadalajara, Jalisco, Mexico; 20°40′40.3″N 103°20′50.5″W

A statue of Heliodoro Hernández Loza is installed along the Rotonda de los Jaliscienses Ilustres, in Centro, Guadalajara, in the Mexican state of Jalisco.
