= Statue of María Izquierdo =

Statue in Guadalajara, Jalisco, Mexico

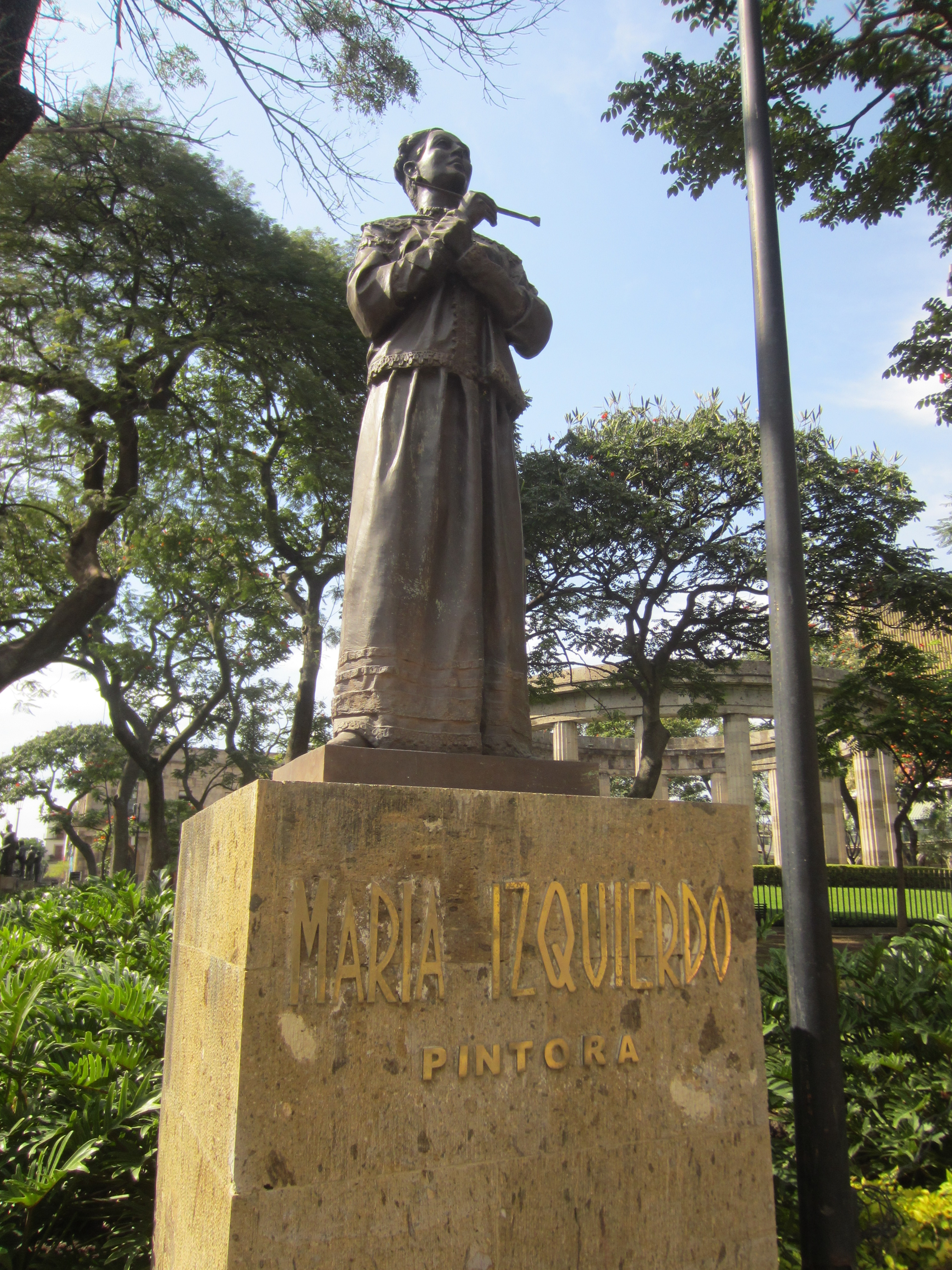
- The statue in 2021
- Subject: María Izquierdo
- Location: Guadalajara, Jalisco, Mexico; 20°40′39.1″N 103°20′48″W

A statue of María Izquierdo is installed along the Rotonda de los Jaliscienses Ilustres, in Centro, Guadalajara, in the Mexican state of Jalisco.
