= Statue of Marcelino García Barragán =

Statue in Guadalajara, Jalisco, Mexico

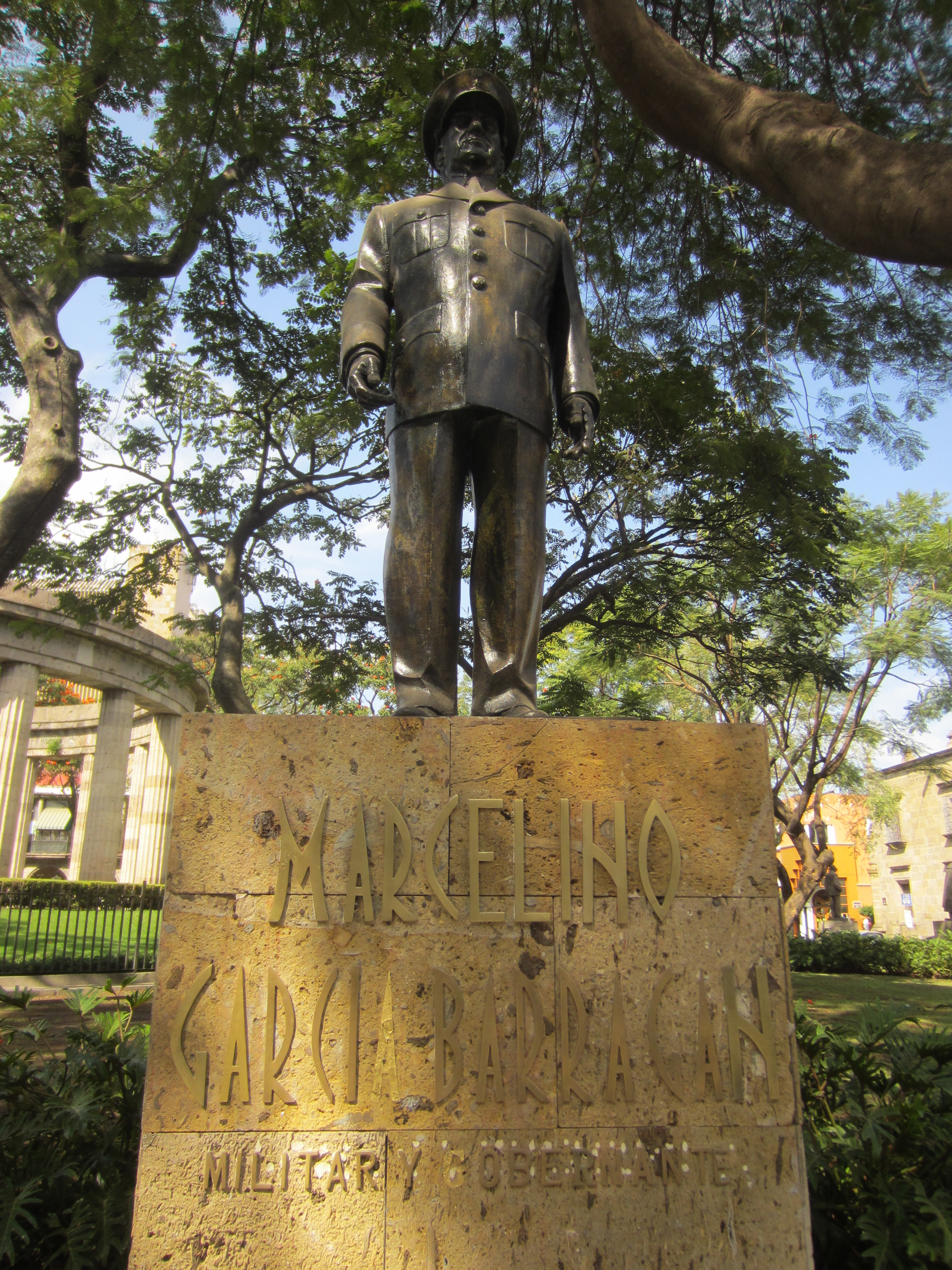
- The statue in 2021
- Subject: Marcelino García Barragán
- Location: Guadalajara, Jalisco, Mexico; 20°40′39″N 103°20′48.5″W

A statue of Marcelino García Barragán is installed along the Rotonda de los Jaliscienses Ilustres, in Centro, Guadalajara, in the Mexican state of Jalisco.
