= Statue of José Guadalupe Zuno =

Statue in Guadalajara, Jalisco, Mexico

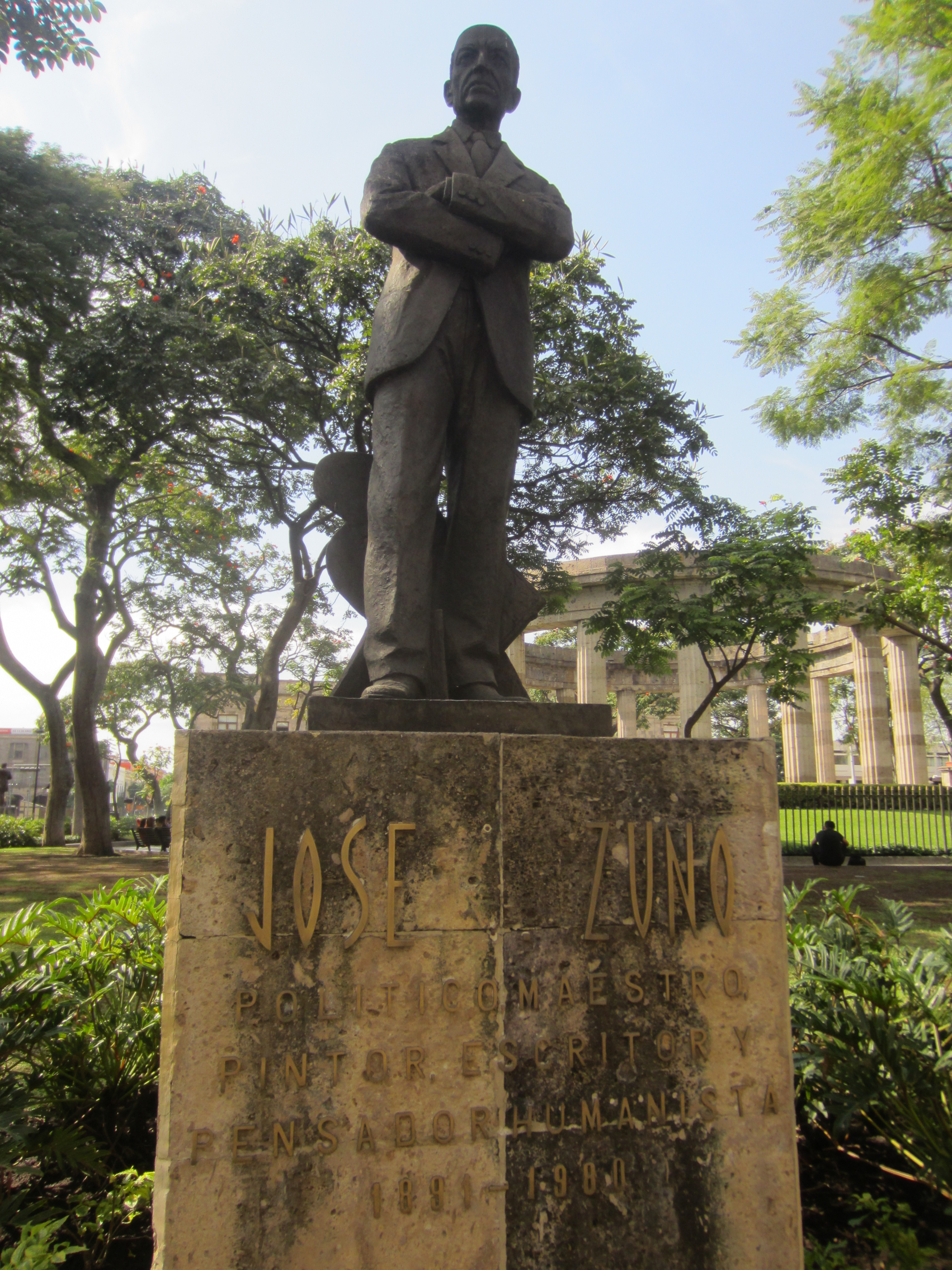
- The statue in 2021
- Subject: José Guadalupe Zuno
- Location: Guadalajara, Jalisco, Mexico; 20°40′39.3″N 103°20′48″W

A statue of José Guadalupe Zuno is installed along the Rotonda de los Jaliscienses Ilustres, in Centro, Guadalajara, in the Mexican state of Jalisco.
