= Arrazola de Oñate =

- noble family
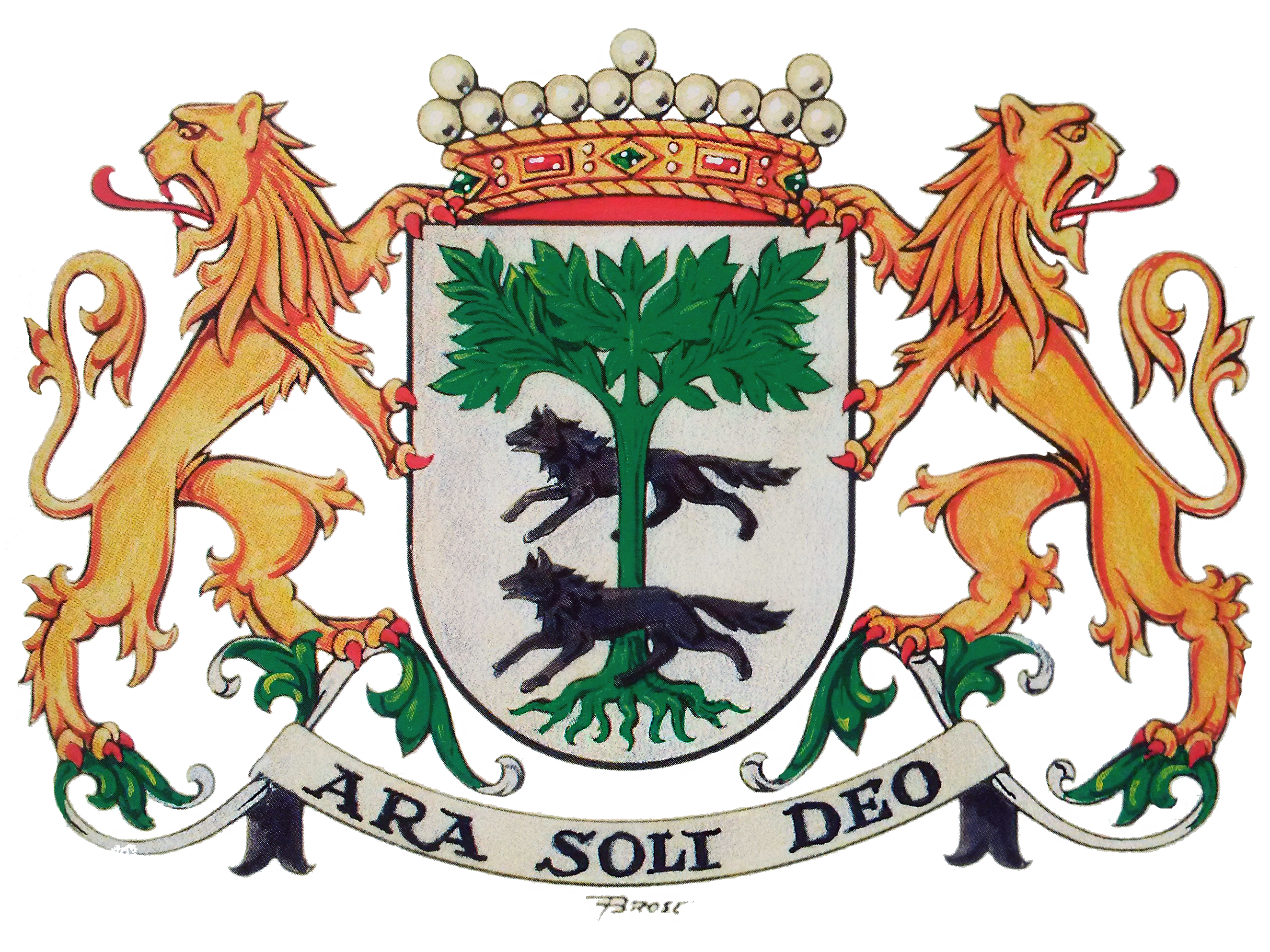
- Country: Kingdom of Belgium
- Current region: Belgium
- Founded: ±1450 (Spain), 1599 (Spanish Netherlands)
- Founder: Juan Alexandro Arrazola de Oñate
- Titles: Baron; Jonkheer
- Motto: Ara Soli Deo

Arrazola de Oñate (also written as de Arrazola Oñate) is a Belgian noble family, stemming from the Arrazola family in the city of Oñate in the Basque Country. Since the 16th century a branch has been living in the Southern Netherlands, later to become the United Kingdom of the Netherlands and Belgium.

== Origin ==
Juan Alexandro Arrazola de Oñate was born around 1580 in the Spanish de Arrazola family and travelled with Isabella and Archduke Albert VII to the Southern Netherlands in order to become their chamberlain. In 1611 he married Beatrice Heath, the daughter of English nobleman Jerome Heath. His Spanish nobility was officially recognised in Flanders and Brabant in 1649.

On 7 August 1647, King Philip IV of Spain made Juan's son, Marc Albert, a Knight. Marc was Lieutenant general of the Falconers of Flanders and mayor of the Brugse Vrije from 1649 to 1659. The Brugse Vrije was a castellany in the county of Flanders, stretching between the North Sea, Sluis, Eeklo, Hooglede, Zarren and the river Yser. Later on he also became Royal Commissioner for the renewal of Bruges' magistracy in 1655, '66 and '67. He is buried in the Prinsenhof in Bruges.

In 1654 Archduke Leopold Wilhelm of Austria, then-Governor of the Spanish Netherlands, made Marc's brother Jean-Jacques councilor and auditor in the Court of Accounts of Brabant, and councillor in the Raad van Financiën, managing the domains of the Habsburg ruler and performing the financial management. In addition to the hereditary nobility coupled to this position, Jean-Jacques was granted the title of Knight.

== Coat of arms ==
The heraldic coat of arms is argent of colour as a symbol of purity, wisdom, innocence and joy. It features an uprooted oak in vert placed between two sable wolves, symbolising both strength and slyness.

== Castles ==
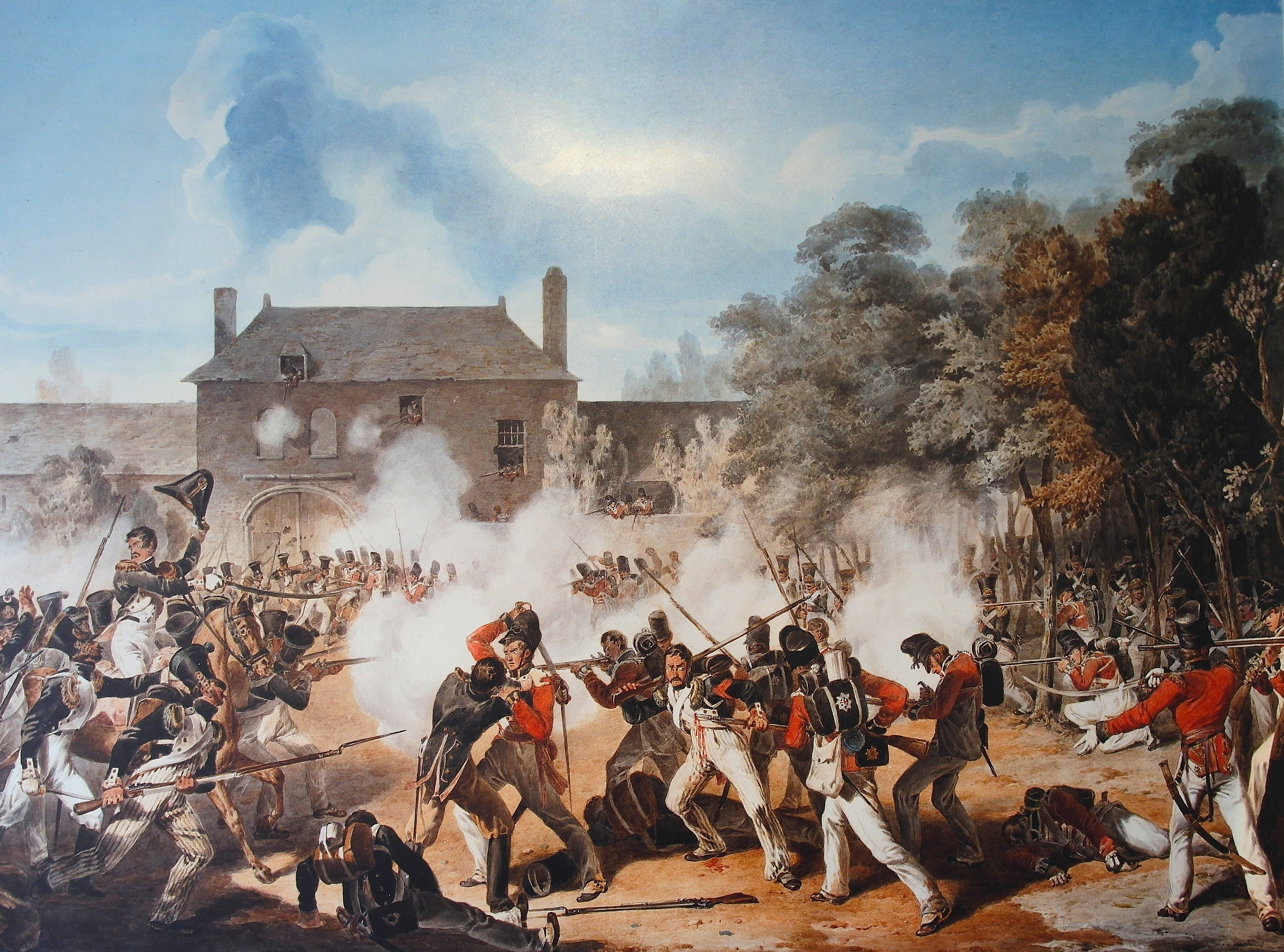
The Defence of Hougoumont by Denis Dighton, 1815. Hougoumont during the Battle of Waterloo

=== Castle Hougoumont ===
The Castle Hougoumont located in Braine-l'Alleud was property of this Spanish family from mid-17th century until the end of the 18th century. The castle had a high-walled garden, an orchard, a park and was the home of the Lords of Gomont for 5 centuries. A couple of years after the death of the last Lord Arrazola de Oñate de Gomont, a member of the Seven Noble Houses of Brussels, the castle prominently featured in the Battle of Waterloo.

The castle was inherited by his widow, who after his death married Philippe Gouret de Louville, a major in the service of Austria. As the officer, 86 years of age, had insufficient funds to rebuild the castle after the Battle of Waterloo, he sold it on May 7, 1816 to François de Robiano.

=== Castle of Hombeek ===
The Castle of Hombeek, later to be called Castle Carmosteyn, was acquired by Ridder Jan-Jacob from the de Boccabella family in 1670. The moated castle became the property of Jean-Antoine Locquet, 1st Viscount of Hombeke as he became the new Lords of Ophombeek in 1680.

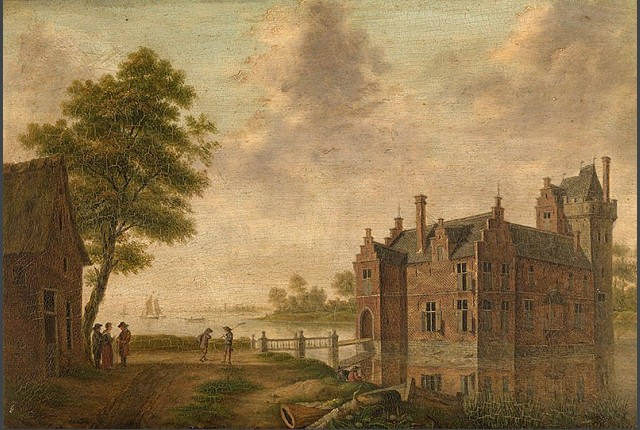
Carmosteyn in the 18th century.

=== Castle of Meldert ===
The feodal Castle of Meldert, build in the second half of the 17th century, was inhabited by the last Lord of Meldert: Marten-Jozef Arrazola de Oñate. Under his tenure the region became a province of the French Republic. All noble privileges were abolished and the final curtain fell for the feudal era. Today, the Arrazola coat of arms is still part of the historical coat of arms of both Meldert and Lummen. The last remains of this castle disappeared in 1871.
