= Hougoumont =

Farmhouse near Waterloo, Belgium

Coordinates: 50°40′14.27″N 4°23′41.28″E

Château d'Hougoumont
- Waterloo, Belgium
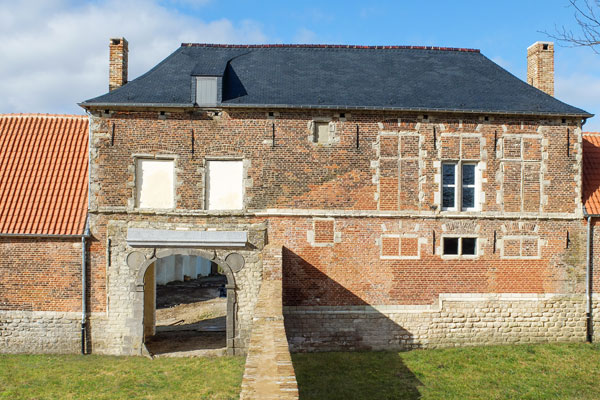
- View of the Hougoumont farm from the south, showing the restored Game Keeper's Cottage and the gate on that side

Site information
- Owner: Intercommunal cooperative society "Bataille de Waterloo 1815"
- Condition: under reconstruction

Site history
- Built: Between 1358 and 1474
- Built by: Order of St. John of Jerusalem (the Knights of Malta)
- Materials: sandstone and red brick
- Battles/wars: Battle of Waterloo

Garrison information
- Occupants: Father Pierre du Fief, Attorney General of the Council of Brabant; Family of Arrazola de Oñate; Philippe Gouret de Louville; François de Robiano; Family of Oultremont; Intercommunal cooperative society "Bataille de Waterloo 1815"

The Château d'Hougoumont (possibly originally Goumont or Gomont) is a walled manorial compound, situated at the bottom of an escarpment near the Nivelles road in the Braine-l'Alleud municipality, near Waterloo, Belgium. The site served as one of the advanced defensible positions of the Anglo-allied army under the Duke of Wellington, that faced Napoleon's Army at the Battle of Waterloo on 18 June 1815.

Hougoumont, which had become dilapidated, was fully restored in time for the 200th anniversary of the battle and opened to the public on 18 June 2015.

== Description ==
Hougoumont has been described as being a lot bigger than La Haye Sainte, a nearby farmhouse. This farmhouse consists of, encompassed by a high-standing wall, the main house, numerous barns, stables, a chapel, and several other features and buildings, including an orchard and garden. The buildings are connected through a system of stone walls with wooden gates. Waterloo Tourisme described it as “the best preserved in terms of how it looked after the Battle [of Waterloo].”

== Etymology ==
The first mention of Hougoumont is found on the 1777 map of the Austrian Netherlands created by Comte Joseph de Ferraris, marked as "Château Hougoumont". This is believed to be a corruption of "Château Goumont", a name first recorded in an act of the allodial court of Brabant in 1358. Also, in 1356, there is mention of the "tenure and house of Gomont" in the seigneury of Braine-l'Alleud.

According to Sir Walter Scott who visited the battlefield in January 1816, "Hougoumont (a name bestowed, I believe, by a mistake of our great commander [Wellington], but which will certainly supersede the more proper one of Château-Goumont) is the only place of consideration which was totally destroyed".

== History ==
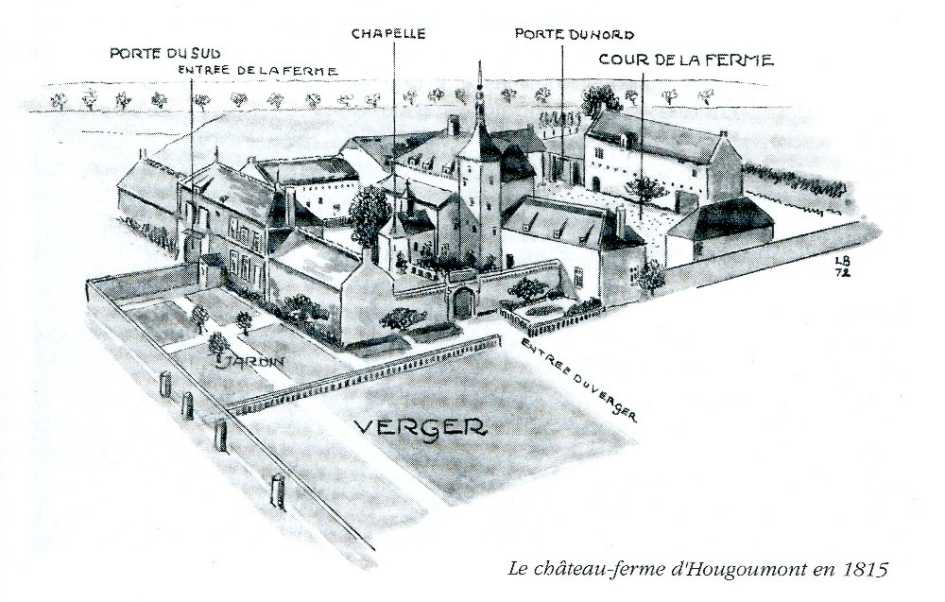
The domain in 1815, before the Battle of Waterloo

In 1474 the Order of Saint John (later to become the Order of Malta) bought 30 acres (0.12 km^{2}) of forest, Le Goumont, and another 30 acres (0.12 km^{2}) of adjacent heathland for 100 golden crowns. (Note: The general history of Hougoumont is a translation of the Dutch and French article on Hougoumont.) The deed of sale did not mention any building on the grounds.

A building had apparently been erected on the land as it was sold in 1536 to Pierre du Fief, attorney-general to the Council of Brabant, who subsequently enlarged the property considerably. In 1562 the estate became the property of Pierre Quarré and stayed in the Quarré family until 1637 when it was bought by Arnold Schuyl, Lord of Walhorn. It was around this time that the present building was erected.

After 1671 the domain became the property of Jan Arrazola de Oñate, chamberlain of Archdukes Albert and Isabella. It remained in the hands of these Lords of Gomont and Tiberchamps until 1791 when Jan-André Arrazola de Oñate died childless at the age of 73. His wife remarried with Phillipe Gouret de Louville, a major in the service of Austria.

Ridder de Louville did not live in the château in 1815 but left the management to Antoine Dumonceau who laid out a splendid French formal garden. After the battle, the then 86 years old Ridder de Louville did not have the funds for much-needed repairs and sold the chateau to François de Robiano.

Through successive marriages and inheritances within the de Robiano family the estate eventually became the property of the d'Oultremont family in 1917. In 2003 it was sold by Count Guibert d'Oultremont to the Belgian Region of Wallonia through an intercommunal cooperative society, Bataille de Waterloo 1815.

== The Defence of Hougoumont ==
In June 1815 the château became a key focus in the Battle of Waterloo as it was one of the first places where British and other allied forces faced Napoleon's Army.

=== June 1815 ===
A map of the Battle of Waterloo, showing Hougoumont in front of Reille's position

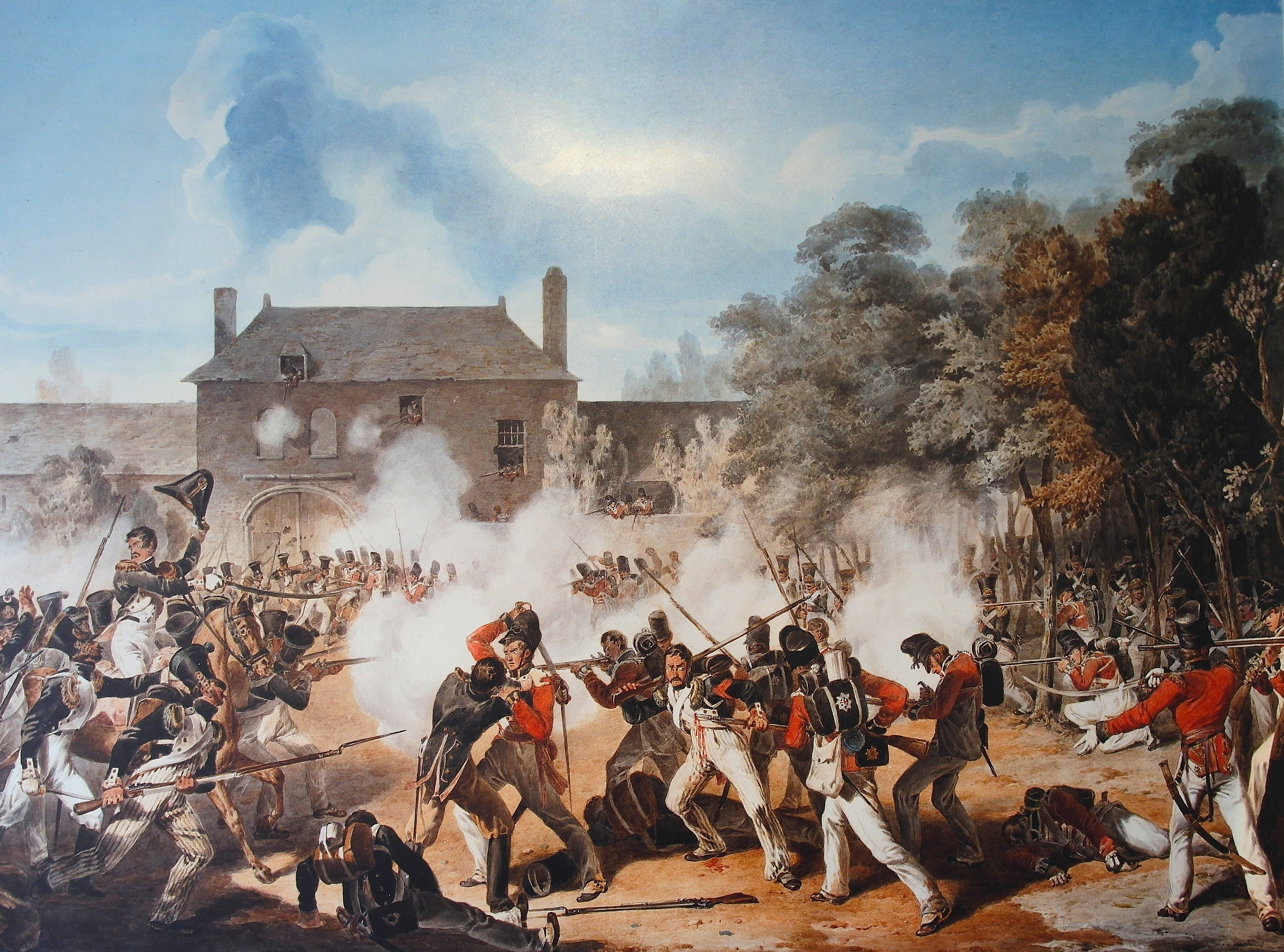
Fighting at the Hougoumont farm during the Battle of Waterloo. The Defence of Hougoumont by Denis Dighton, 1815.

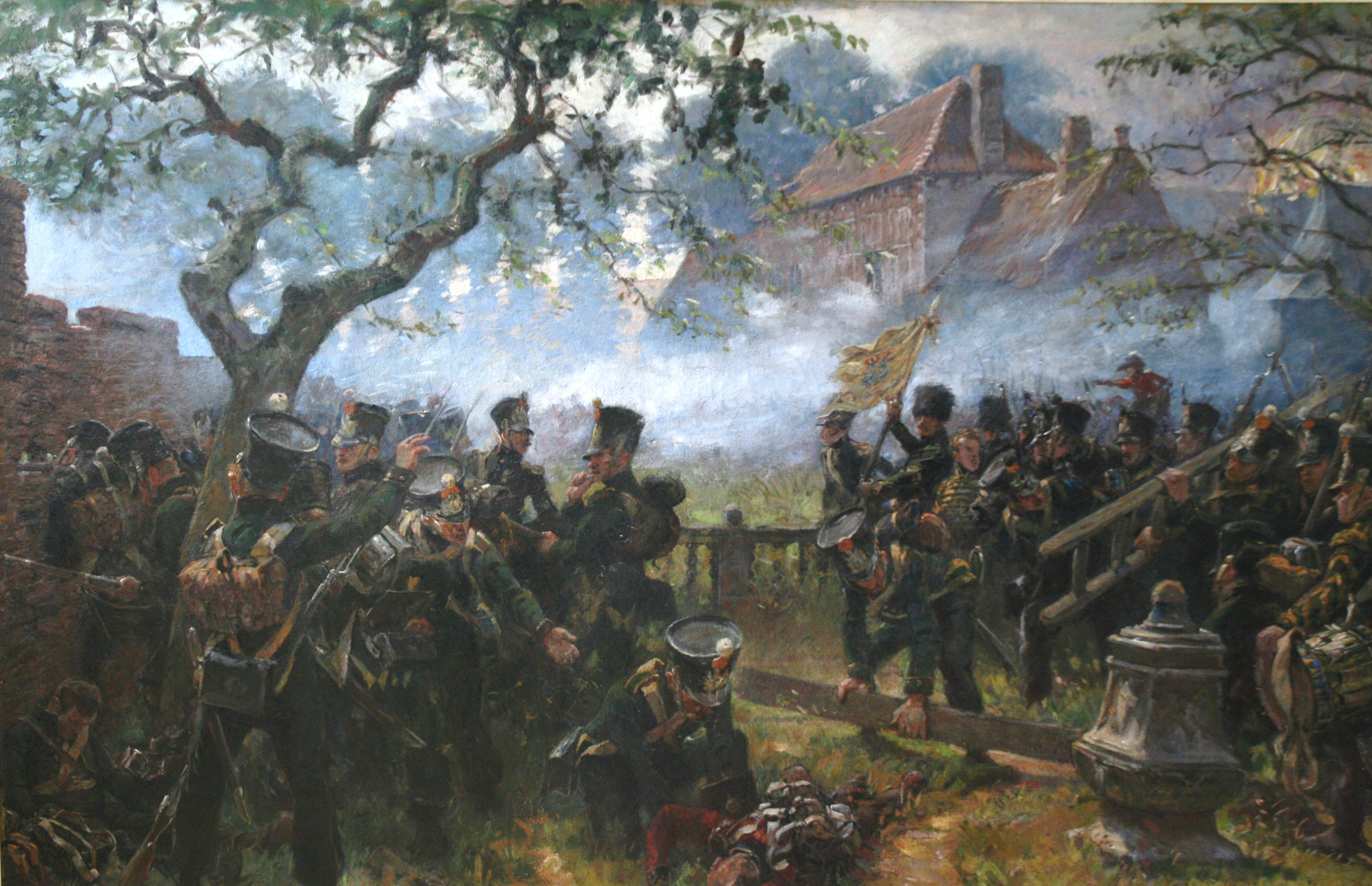
Nassuvian troops at Hougoumont, mainly soldiers of the 1st Battalion of the 2nd Regiment

Napoleon planned to draw Wellington's reserve to Wellington's right flank in defence of Hougoumont and then attack through the centre left of the British and allies' front near La Haye Sainte.

Before the battle started, Hougoumont and its gardens, located on the allies' right flank, were garrisoned and fortified by the 1st Battalion, 2nd Nassau Regiment, with additional detachments of jägers and landwehr from von Kielmansegge's 1st (Hanoverian) Brigade. The light company of the 2nd Battalion, Coldstream Guards under the command of Lt-Colonel Henry Wyndham, was also stationed in the farm and château, and the light company of the 2nd Battalion, Third Guards, under Lt-Colonel Charles Dashwood in the garden and grounds. The two light companies of the 2nd and 3rd Battalions, First Guards were initially positioned in the orchard, under the command of Lieutenant-Colonel Lord Saltoun. Lieutenant-Colonel James Macdonell, Coldstream Guards, had overall command of Hougoumont. (The Guards units were all drawn from General John Byng's 2nd (British) Brigade.)

Wellington recorded in his despatches "at about ten o'clock [Napoleon] commenced a furious attack upon our post at Hougoumont". Other sources state that this attack was at about 11:30. The historian Andrew Roberts notes that "It is a curious fact about the battle of Waterloo that no one is absolutely certain when it actually began".

The initial attack by Maréchal de Camp Pierre François Bauduin's 1st Brigade of the 6th Division emptied the wood and park, but was driven back by heavy British artillery fire and cost Bauduin his life. The British guns were distracted into an artillery duel with French guns and this allowed a second attack by Maréchal de Camp Baron Soye's 2nd Brigade of the 6th Division. They managed a small breach on the south side but could not exploit it. An attack on the north side by elements of the 1st Brigade of the 6th Division was more successful.

This attack led to one of the most famous skirmishes in the Battle of Waterloo — Sous-Lieutenant Legros, wielding an axe, managed to break through the north gate. A desperate fight ensued between the invading French soldiers and the defending Guards. In a near-miraculous attack, Macdonell, a small party of officers and Sergeant James Graham fought through the melee to shut the gate, trapping Legros and about 30 other soldiers of the 1st Légère inside. All of the French who entered were killed except a drummer boy in the desperate hand-to-hand fight.

The British and German Garrison were running low on ammunition and a Driver of the Royal Waggon Train distinguished himself by driving an ammunition cart through the French lines to resupply the troops despite his horses receiving wounds. The French attack in the immediate vicinity of the farm was repulsed by the arrival of the 2nd battalion Coldstream Guards and 2/3rd Foot Guards. Fighting continued around Hougoumont all afternoon with its surroundings heavily invested with French light infantry and coordinated cavalry attacks sent against the troops behind Hougoumont.

Wellington's army defended the house and the hollow way running north from it. In the afternoon Napoleon personally ordered the shelling of the house causing it to burn. Seeing the flames, Wellington sent a note to the house's commander stating that he must hold his position whatever the cost, resulting in the destruction of all but the chapel. Du Plat's brigade of the King's German Legion was brought forward to defend the hollow way, which they had to do without any senior officers, who were then relieved by the 71st Foot, a Scottish light infantry regiment. Adam's brigade, further reinforced by Hugh Halkett's 3rd (Hanoverian) Brigade, successfully repulsed further infantry and cavalry attacks sent by Reille and maintained the occupation of Hougoumont until the end of the battle.

=== The battle's significance ===
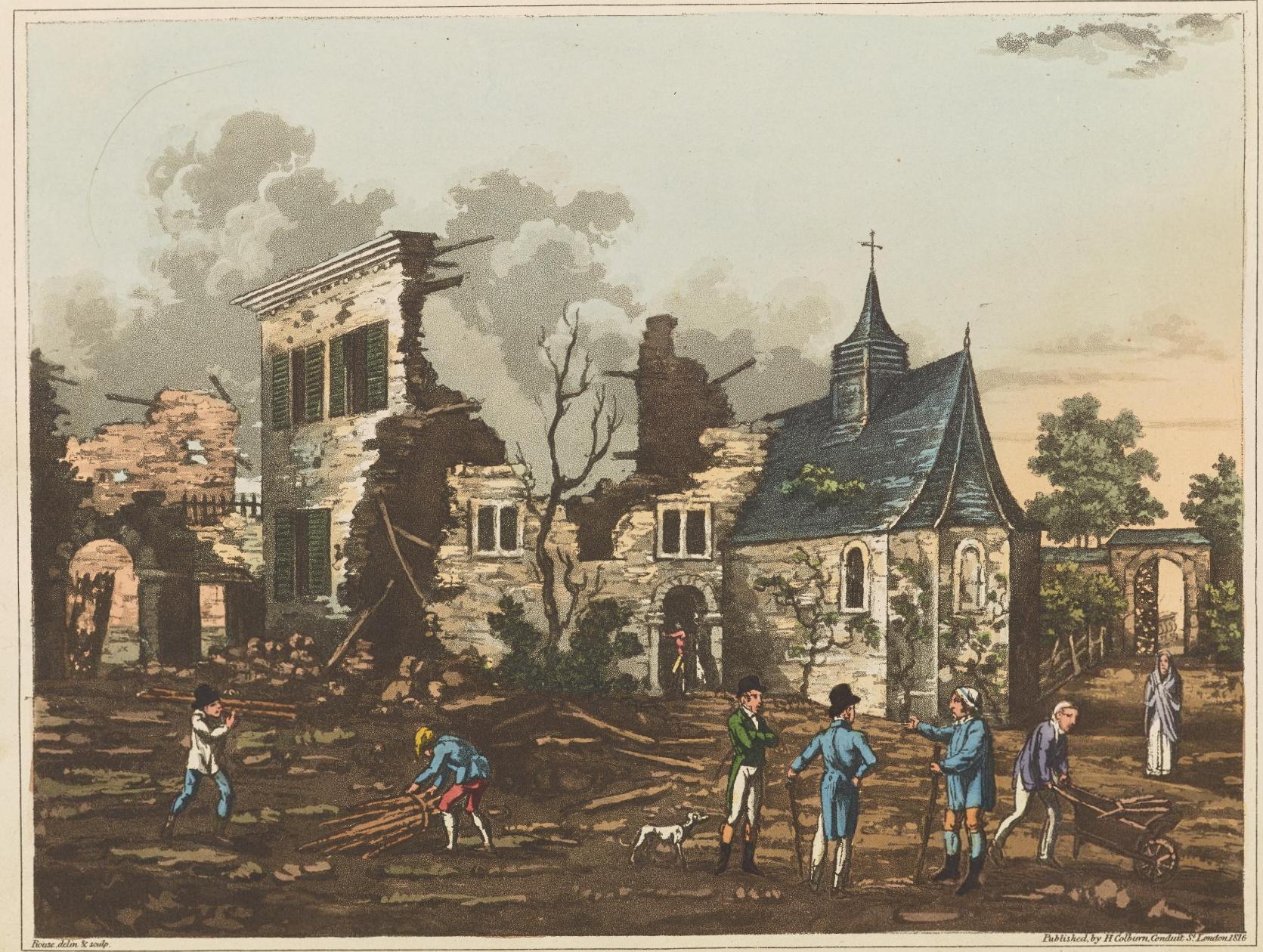
The interior of Hougoumont, reduced nearly to a heap of ruins, by C. C. Hamilton engraved by James Rous.

The Hougoumont battle has often been characterised as a diversionary attack to cause Wellington to move reserves to his threatened right flank to protect his communications, but this then escalated into an all-day battle which drew in more and more French troops but just a handful of Wellington's, having the exact opposite effect to that intended. In fact there is a good case that both Napoleon and Wellington thought Hougoumont was a vital part of the battle. Certainly, Wellington declared afterwards that "the success of the battle turned upon the closing of the gates at Hougoumont".

Hougoumont was a part of the battlefield that Napoleon could see clearly and he continued to direct resources towards it and its surroundings all afternoon (33 battalions in all, 14,000 troops). The French forces sent in to attack Hougoumont included:

- nearly the entire II Corps under the command of General Honoré Reille, consisting of detachments of the 6th Division under the command of Jérôme, (Napoleon's youngest brother), the divisions of Comte Maximilien Foy (9th), Guilleminot and Joseph Bachelu (5th)
- Kellermann's cavalry corps

Similarly, though the house never contained a large number of troops, Wellington devoted 21 battalions (12,000 troops) over the course of the afternoon to keeping the hollow way open to allow fresh troops and ammunition to be admitted to the house. He also moved several artillery batteries from his hard-pressed centre to support Hougoumont.

== Bodies in wells ==
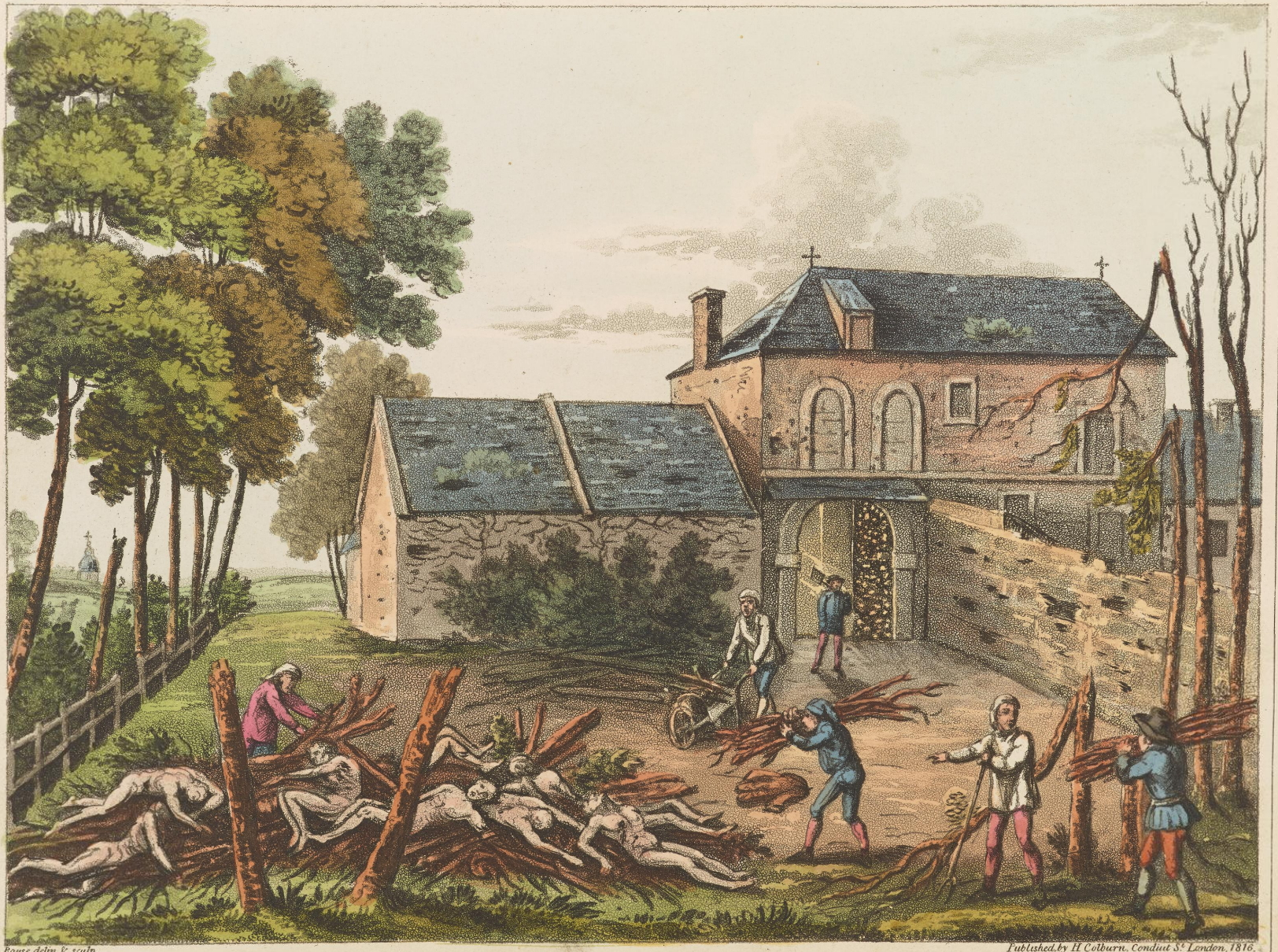
A view of the Château d'Hogoumont, workmen piling timber upon a pyre to burn the French dead by: C. C. Hamilton engraved by James Rouse

In his novel Les Misérables, Victor Hugo describes how 300 bodies were thrown down a well at Hougoumont. Several historians have noted that an archaeological dig of the well by Derick Saunders in 1985 turned up no human remains in a well rediscovered at the site. In doing so, they state that it debunks a myth made popular by Hugo.

A popular account of the battle by John Booth published in London shortly after the battle includes a diary entry by an early gentleman tourist to the site. The tourist records that he was shown around that battlefield by the well known guide, Jean-Baptiste Decoster, and that 16 July 1815 (one month after the battle) he saw two wells, one that contained eight men and another that contained 73 men. The first well was at La Belle Alliance "wherein we saw the bodies of eight men of the Imperial Guard of Napoleon; they had jumped down with their arms"; and the second probably at Hougoumont, "The French formed a battery by making holes in the garden-wall; here is another well, in which were found 73 men; the trees in the orchard were peppered very much; the ditch around this orchard was used as a battery, and hundreds killed; saw 84 other pieces of cannon taken from the enemy; they took home only 12 guns; counted 40 graves, containing English officers, in one acre of ground, resembling dung-heaps".

== Decay and restoration ==
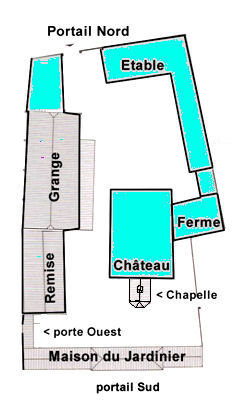
Plan of the farm, by F Bonaert, 1974

Hougoumont remained an active farm until the end of the 20th century. In 2003 a settlement was reached between Count Guibert d'Oultremont, owner of the farm, and the Regional Authority after which it became the property of the Intercommunale (1815). By June 2006, the farm appeared to be derelict. The walls, which were once near pristine white, had become a dirty yellow. Several walls were cracked and parts were clearly damaged, most notably the right-hand door post of the north side gate.

Project Hougoumont, supported by, amongst others, the then-current Duke of Wellington, writer Bernard Cornwell and the late historian Richard Holmes, was set up to oversee funding to restore and preserve Hougoumont for the long-term future. The project was completed in June 2015 at a cost of £3m, with organisations including the Landmark Trust contributing to the funds in return for being allowed to rent part of the property (the Game Keeper's Cottage). Charles, Prince of Wales, unveiled a memorial at Hougoumont on 17 June 2015 dedicated to the British soldiers who fought in the battle. The memorial by Vivien Mallock stands next to the north gate and shows two life-size soldiers struggling to close the critical gates of the farm to save it from being overrun by the French. The next day (18 June 2015) Hougoumont was opened to the public on the 200th anniversary of the Battle of Waterloo.

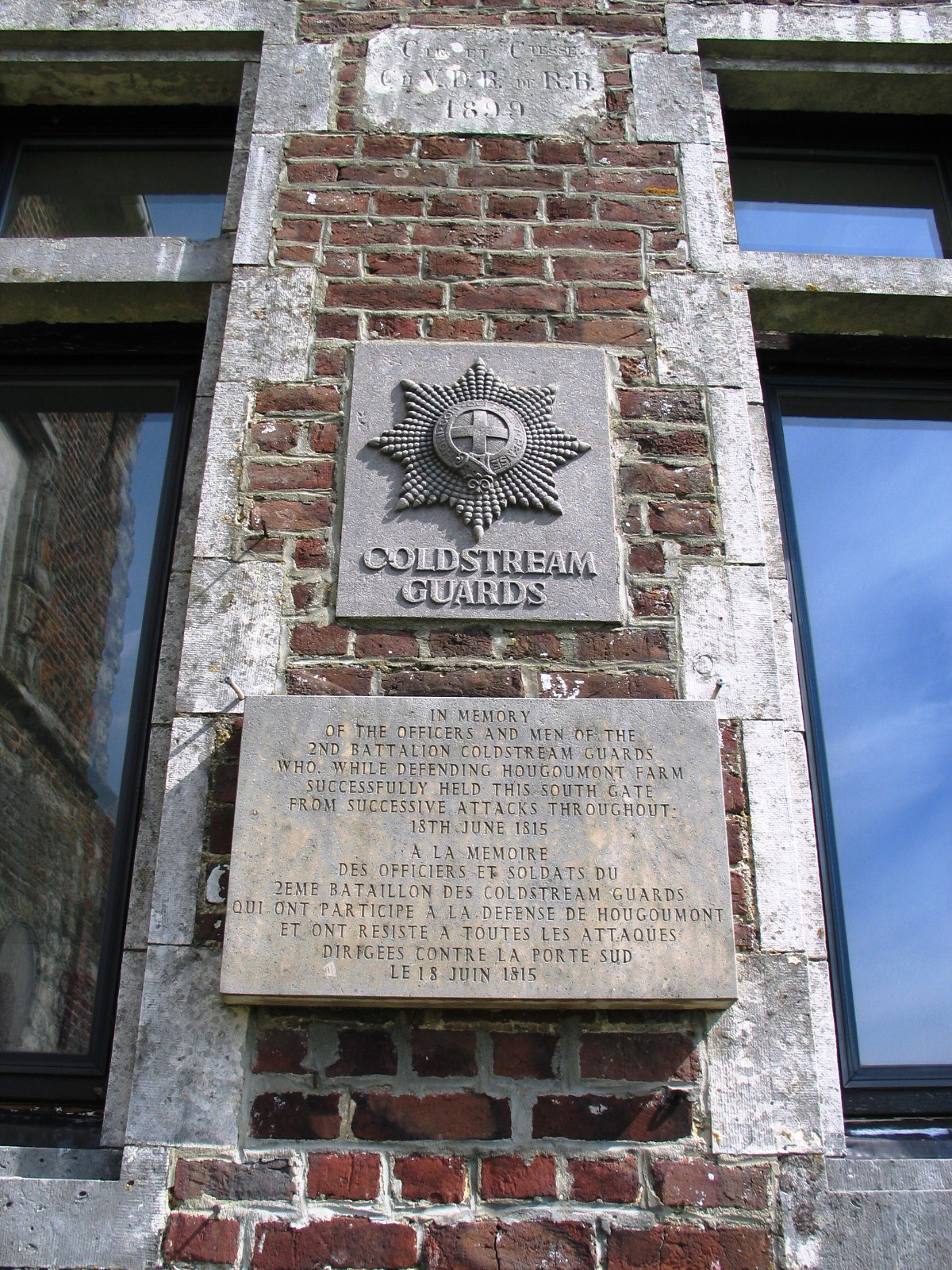
A plaque in the memory of the Coldstream Guards

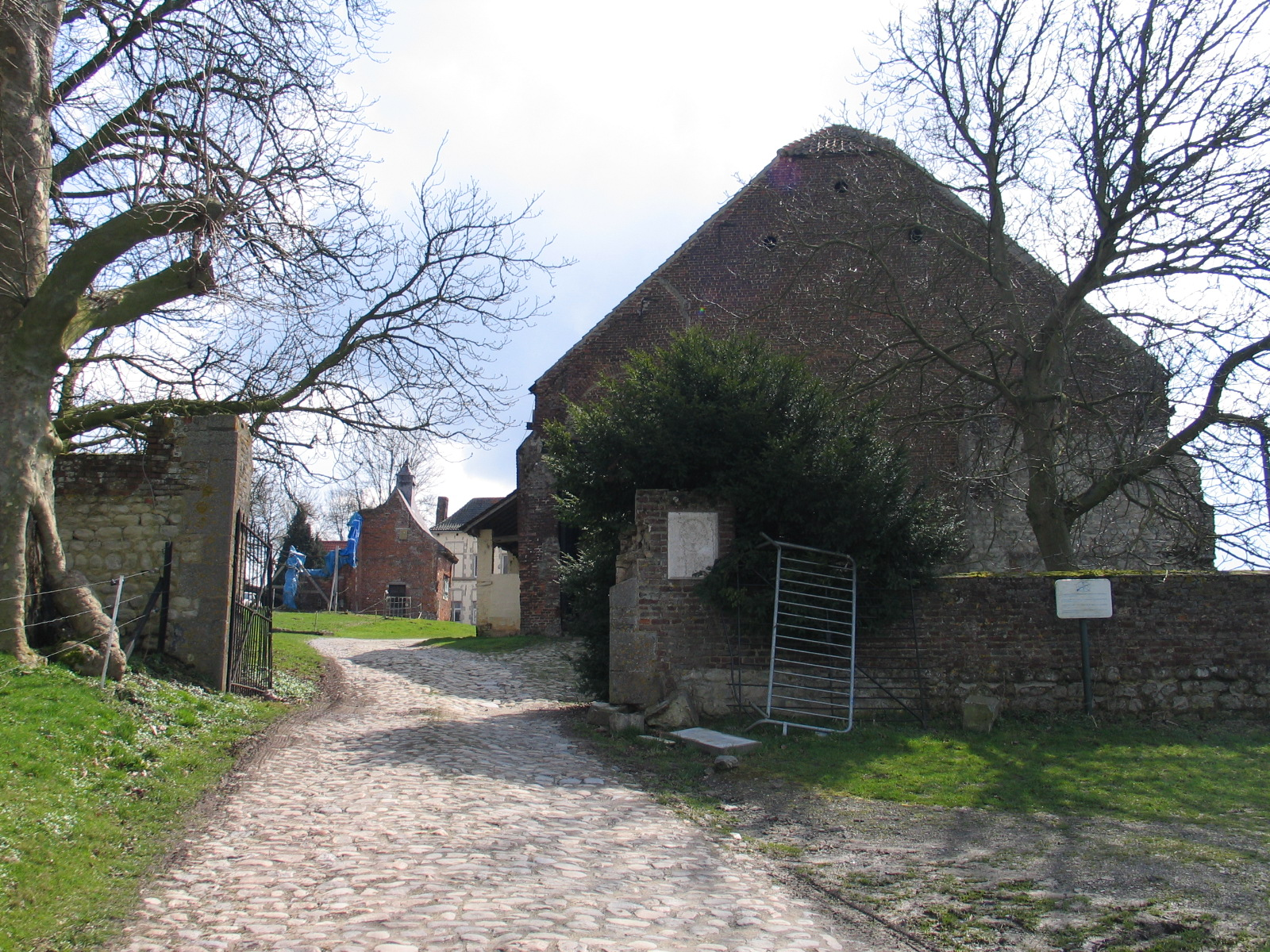
Gate on the north side attacked by French 1st Légère defended by British Guards

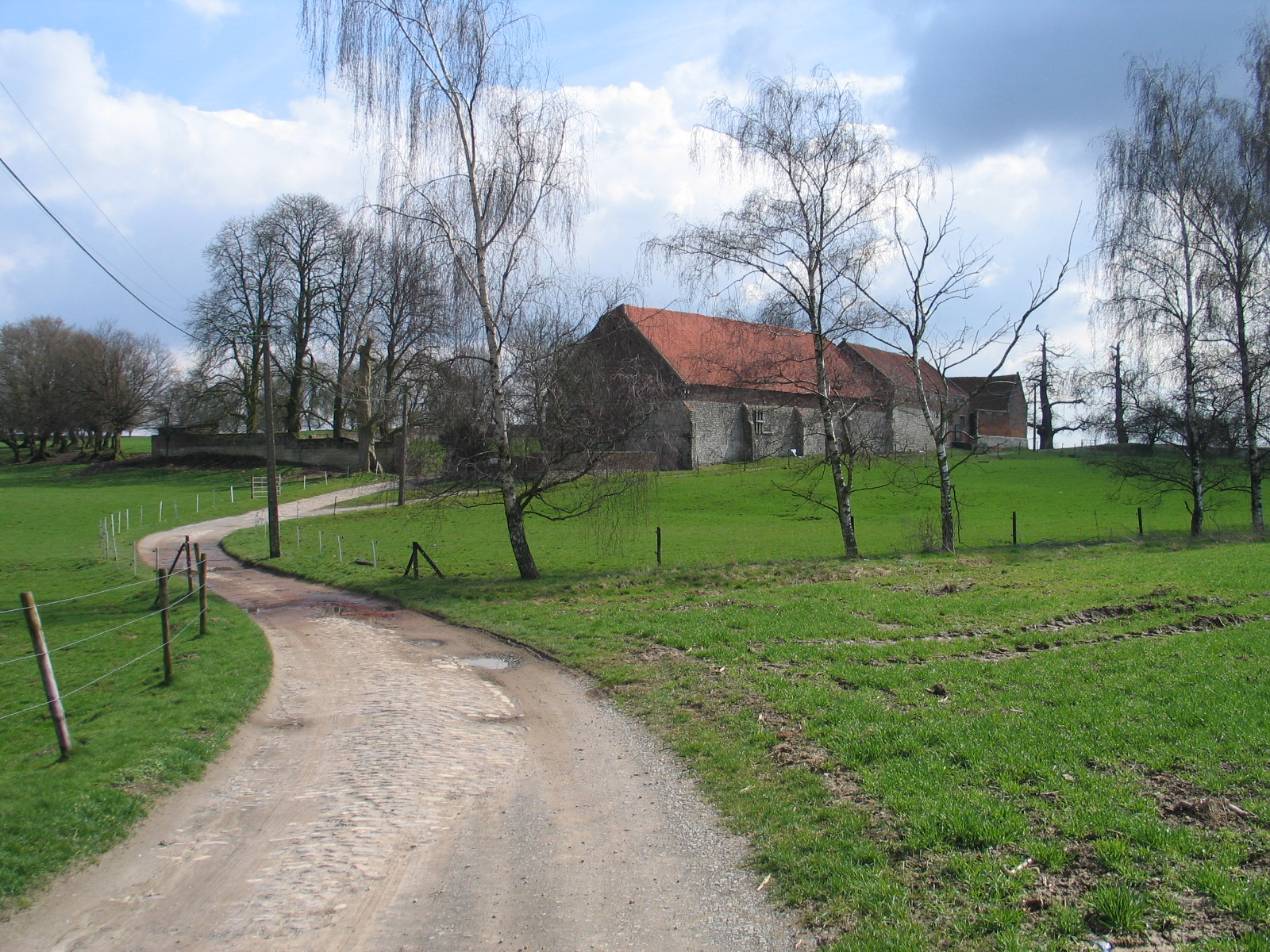
Hougoumont

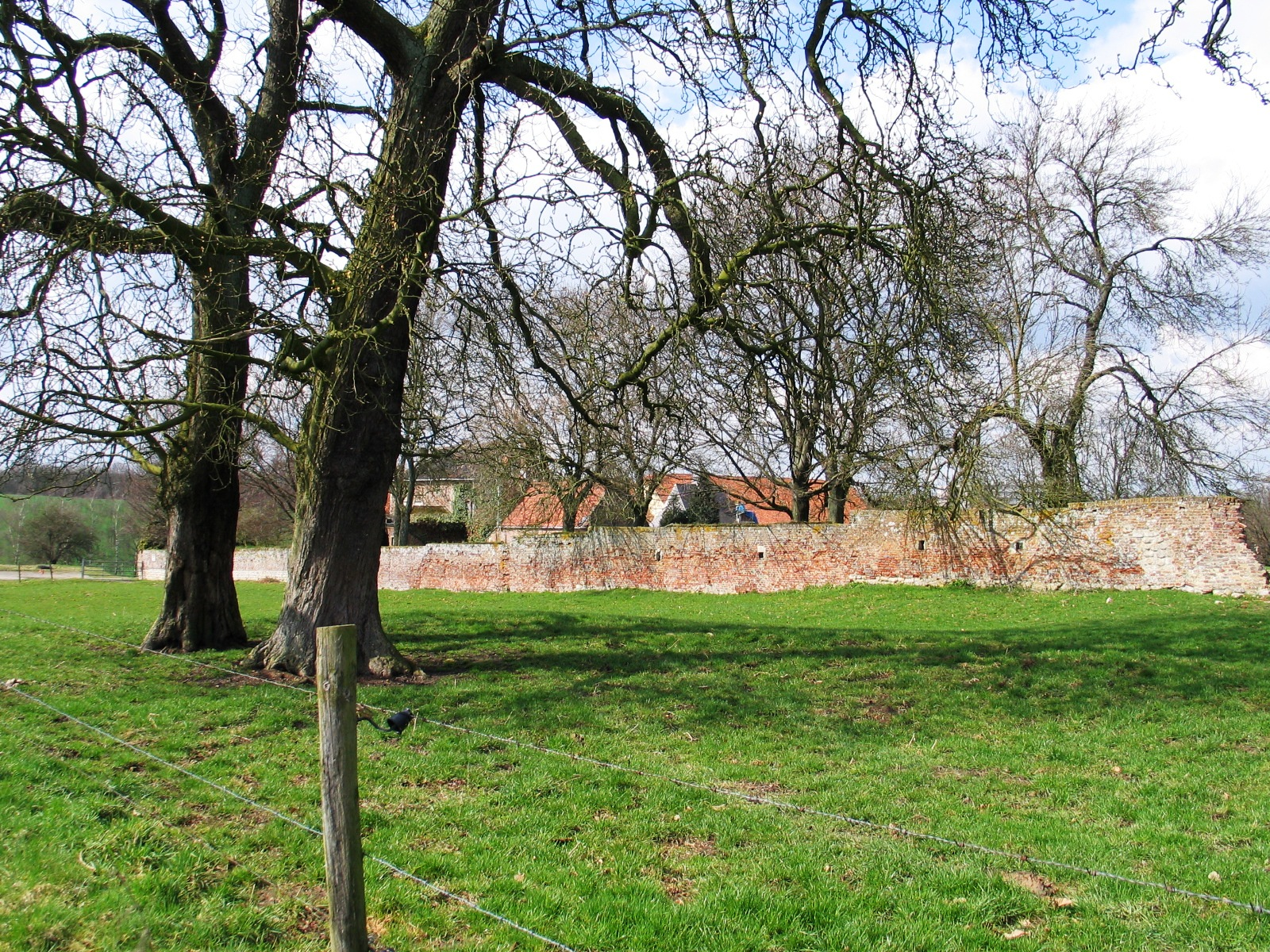
Wall on the south side

== See also ==
- Order of Battle of the Waterloo Campaign
- List of Waterloo Battlefield locations
