= Arrazola =

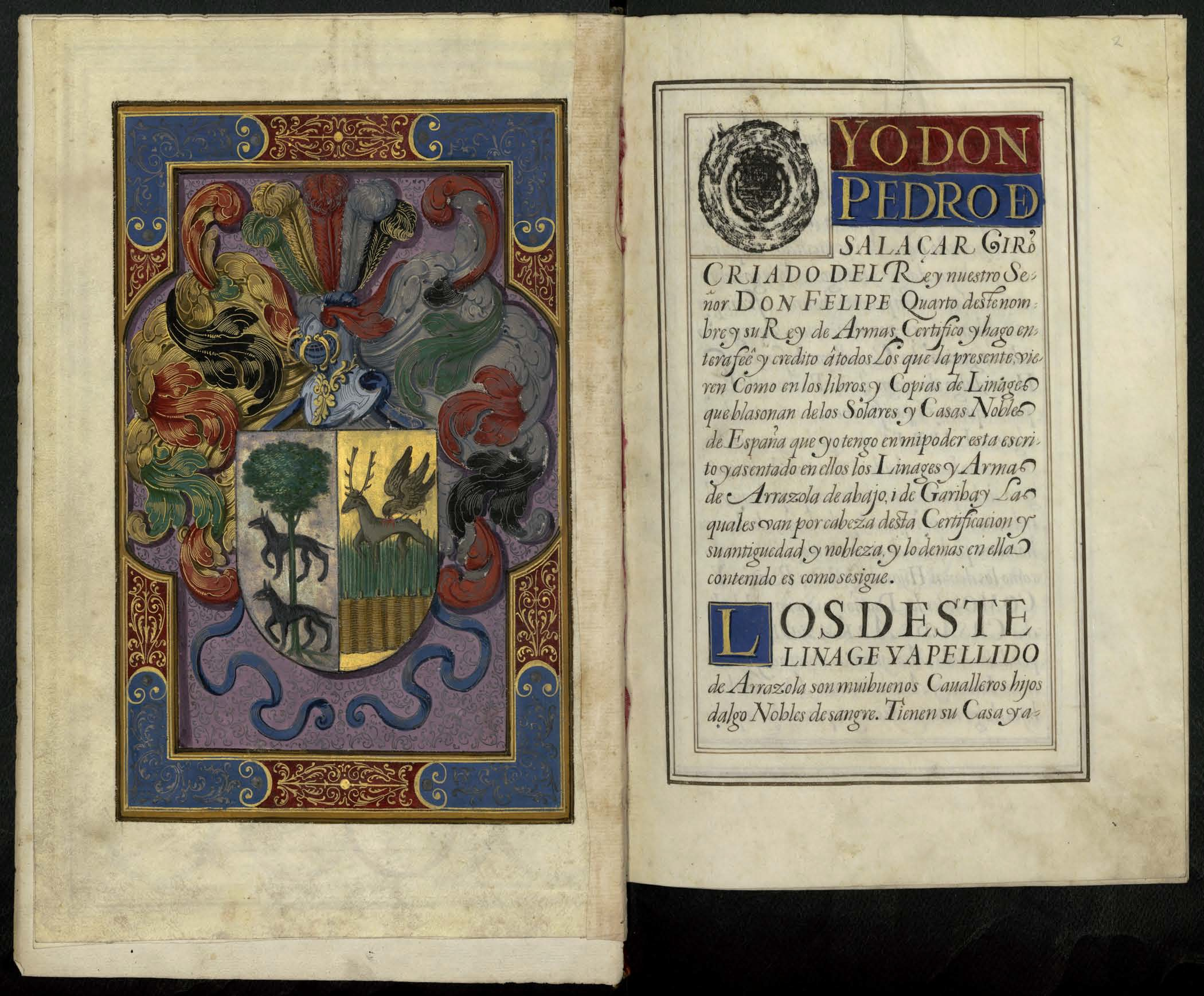
Illuminated Spanish nobility certificate (1646)

The surname Arrazola (also written as: de Arrazola, Arraçola, Arazola, Arazzola, etc.) traces back to the Gipuzkoa province of Spain and stems from an historic family of lower Spanish nobility. A number of its members fulfilled high governmental, administrative and military functions in the Spanish Empire. While still present in current day Spain, name-bearers can also be found in Colombia, Mexico and Belgium.

== Origin ==
The earliest proof of the name Arrazola that refers to this specific family is a made in court cases before the Royal Audiencia and Chancillería of Valladolid from the early 15th century. Proofs of nobility ('Uradel') issued in the 16th and 17th century however let the genealogy ascend up into the 14th century. A number of original written references confirm these roots, but remain currently unlinked to each other making it unclear where the true origins lie.

Most of the family members originally lived on the axis between Arrasate, Oñati and Arrazola, of which the family name stems and still holds the historic family seat. Those that received higher education moved from this area to the bigger cities, such as Valladolid and Vitoria-Gasteiz.

Several members of the Arrazola family held public functions throughout the years in both the local region, as the capitals of Madrid and Valladolid. The extensive genealogy, and the exercise of public functions made this family a prime example of Hidalgos Solariego: they were considered most noble, were exempted from paying taxes, yet owned little real property. This was confirmed by several courts from 1711 to 1793, and by the Royal Chancillería of Valladolid in 1783.

== Branches ==
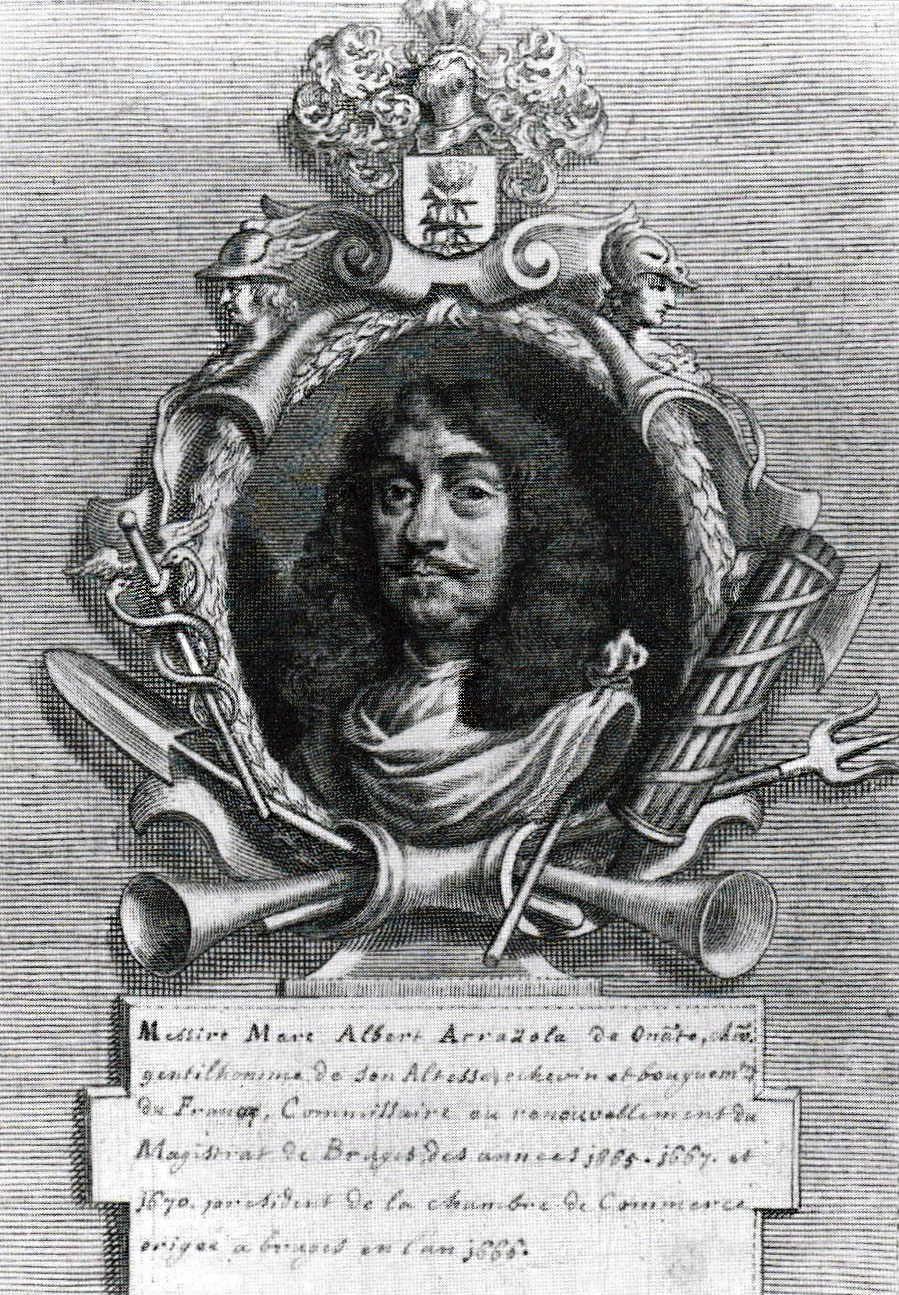
Marc-Albert Arrazola (1612–1674)

Through the functions held by a couple of Arrazolas in the Spanish national government, other family members gained preferential access to attractive positions. While Bernabe Arrazola, for example, was Private Secretary to Philip II of Spain in Madrid, Philips only daughter was sent to the Spanish Netherlands with a large household, in which Bernabe's younger brother Juan Alexandro was Isabella's personal chamberlain.

This resulted in a number of branches being established throughout the world, notably the regions that once were under Spanish influence: Colombia, Mexico and Belgium. While originally Spanish, the branches that established themselves abroad were historically arguably the most significant. Both the branches of Arrazola de Oñate in the Low Countries and Arrazola de Mondragon in the Grand Duchy of Tuscany brought forward a number of military leaders, feudal lords and high ranking councillors.

== Notable Members ==
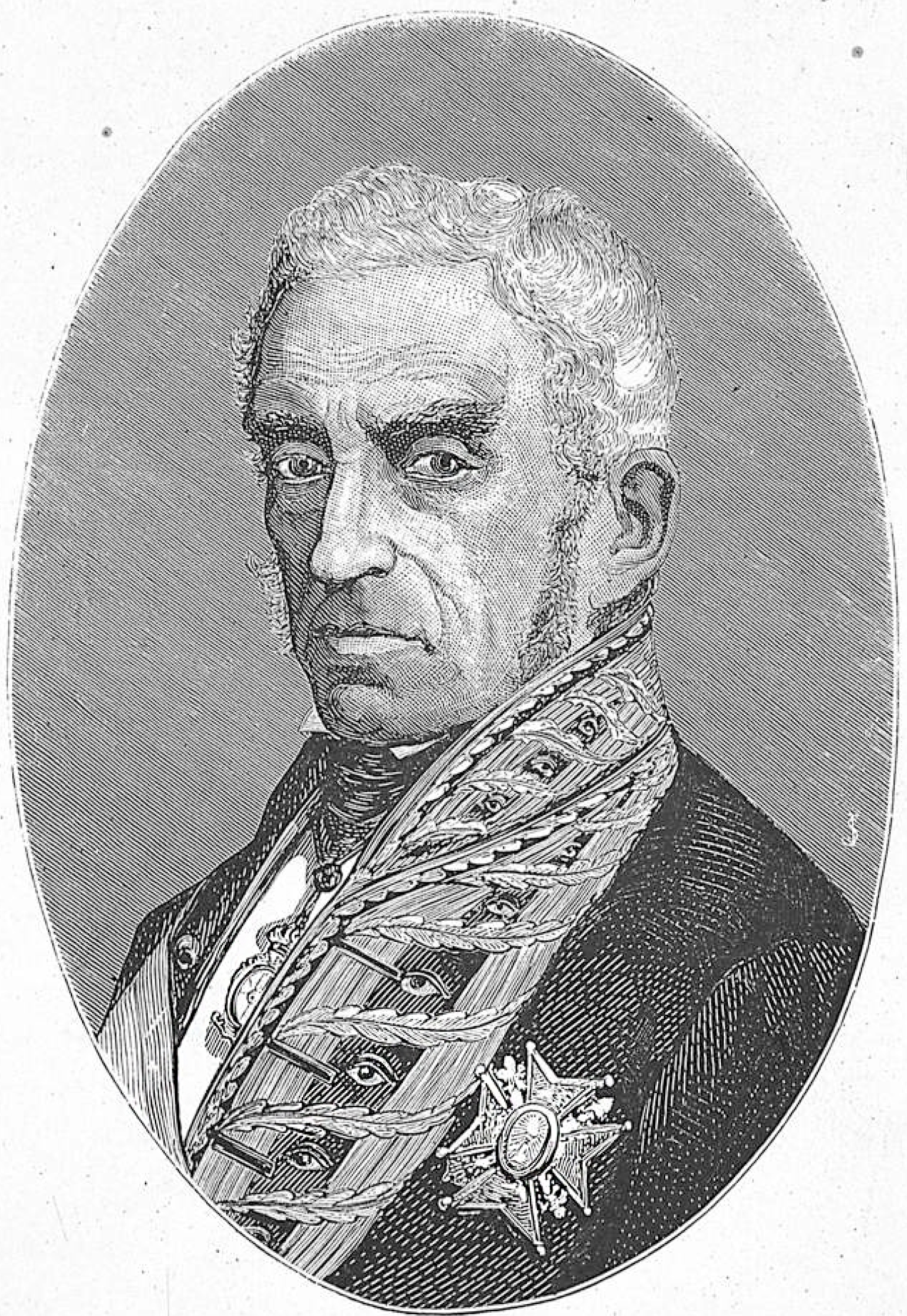
Lorenzo Arrazola (1797–1873)

In historic order:

- Fabio Arrazola de Mondragone (± 1525 - 1586), Private tutor of Francesco I de' Medici and Knight in the Order of Santiago.
- Juan Alexandro de Arrazola de Oñate (1580–1653), chamberlain of the Infante Isabella in the Spanish Netherlands.
- Juan de Arrazola: Royal Governor of Spanish Florida.
- Marc-Albert Arrazola de Oñate (1612–1674), Knight and Mayor of the Franc of Bruges
- Jean-Jacques Arrazola de Oñate (1615–1688), Knight, Supreme Intendant and private secretary to Archduke Leopold Wilhelm of Austria
- Grace Angelique Arrazola de Oñate (1676–1746), Marquess of Montpuillan and Bouchet
- Jean Nepomucène Arrazola de Oñate (1784–1861), Baron of Meldert and member of the Limburg Ridderschap of the United Kingdom of the Netherlands
- D. Lorenzo Arrazola (1797–1873), 50th Prime Minister of Spain, 9th and 13th President of the Spanish Supreme Court, knight of the Order of the Golden Fleece.
