= Richard Dighton =

English artist

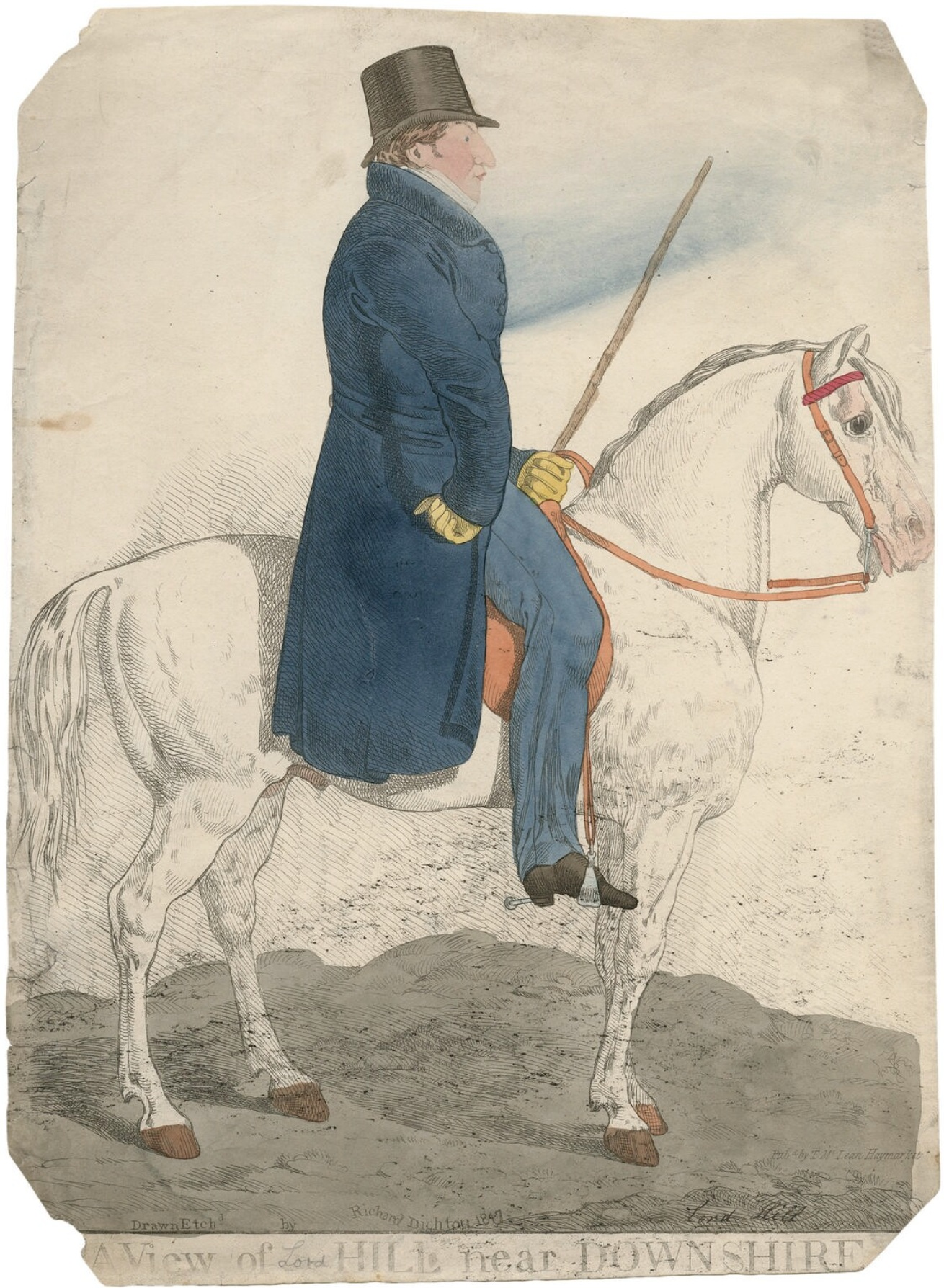
1817 portrait of Arthur Hill, 3rd Marquess of Downshire by Dighton

Richard Dighton (1795 – 13 April 1880) was an English artist in the Regency period, best known for his many satirical profile portraits of contemporary London celebrities and characters.

He was the son and apprentice of another noted caricaturist, Robert Dighton (1752–1814), and brother of the battle-scene painter Denis Dighton and of Robert Dighton junior. The works of Robert and Richard Dighton are regarded as predecessors of the Vanity Fair style of the late nineteenth century.

His series of City and West End portraits was started in 1817, and he published more than one hundred etchings during the next decade. From 1828 on he produced no further etchings and settled and worked in Cheltenham and Worcester where he spent the next twenty years, thereafter returning to London. He concentrated firstly on watercolour portraits and after 1835 on lithographic portraits.

Richard Dighton died of an 'enlarged prostate and Bright's disease' at 3 Elm Grove, Hammersmith on 13 April 1880 aged 84. His sons Richard junior and Joshua were also portraitists.
