= James Graham (British Army soldier) =

British Army non-commissioned officer

- Born: c. 1791; County Monaghan, Ireland
- Died: 28 April 1845 (aged 53–54); Royal Hospital, Kilmainham
- Military career
- Allegiance: United Kingdom
- Branch: British Army
- Service years: 1813–1830
- Rank: Sergeant
- Units: Coldstream Guards; 12th Royal Lancers
- Conflicts: Napoleonic Wars; Siege of Bergen op Zoom; Battle of Quatre Bras; Battle of Waterloo
- Awards: specially cast gallantry medal Waterloo Medal recognition as "the bravest man in England"

James Graham (c. 1791–1845) was an Irish non-commissioned officer (NCO) in the British Army during the Napoleonic Wars, recognised as the "bravest man in the army" by the Duke of Wellington. Serving in the Coldstream Guards, he was commended for his gallantry during the defence of Hougoumont, at Waterloo. Graham saved the life of an officer, and his own brother, and was among the small group responsible for closing the North Gate at Hougoumont after a French attack – an act which won the Duke of Wellington's encomium. He was rewarded with a specially cast gallantry medal and an annuity. After later serving in the 12th Royal Lancers, Graham was discharged in 1830 for ill health, and died at the Royal Hospital Kilmainham in 1845.

== Early life and service ==
James Graham was born in 1791, in Clones, County Monaghan, Ireland.

One of three brothers to serve in the British Army, Graham enlisted in the 2nd Battalion of the Coldstream Guards in 1813, which was then stationed in England. Almost all soldiers at the time signed on for life in exchange for a "bounty" of £23 17s 6d, a large portion of which was absorbed by the cost of outfitting "necessities".

Graham was assigned to the battalion's light company, and, by 1815, had been made a corporal. It was not unusual for Irishmen to join English or Scottish regiments after the Act of Union between Great Britain and Ireland; as a consequence many battalions during the Napoleonic wars had some Irish soldiers.

The Coldstream Guards were a regiment of Foot Guards, a group of elite infantry regiments of the British Army. In background and natural attributes, recruits to the Foot Guards differed little from those recruited into other regiments, but they received superior training and were expected to maintain rigorous discipline. Wellington considered Guards NCOs to be among the best in the army.

== The road to Waterloo ==
The United Kingdom and her Allies had been at war against Napoleon's French Empire since 1803, but by early 1814 Wellington's army had fought its way through the Peninsula to France, and the eastern Allies were threatening France's eastern borders. On 31 March 1814, allied armies entered Paris, and Napoleon abdicated on 6 April. Within a month of Napoleon's abdication, he had been exiled to Elba. It appeared that the war was over, and arrangements for the peace were discussed at the Congress of Vienna. But on 26 February 1815, Napoleon escaped from Elba and returned to France, where he raised an army.

The Allies assembled another army and planned for a summer offensive. The combatant Coldstream companies had been garrisoned in Brussels and Ath, where they were joined by the 2nd Battalion's remaining four companies in early 1815. In preparation for the coming offensive, Graham's battalion joined with the 2nd Battalion of the Scots Guards to form the 1st Division's 2nd Brigade. Basing themselves in Belgium, the Allies formed two armies, with the Duke of Wellington commanding the Anglo-Allies, and Gebhard Leberecht von Blücher commanding the Prussians. Napoleon marched swiftly through France to meet them, and split his army to launch a two-pronged attack. On 16 June 1815, Napoleon himself led men against Blücher at Ligny, while Marshall Ney commanded an attack against Wellington's forward army at the Battle of Quatre Bras.

The Waterloo Campaign. Enghien can be seen due west of Waterloo.

Wellington had received news of Napoleon's position on the night of 15 June, and issued orders to his army to hold the ground at Quatre Bras. Graham's battalion, along with the rest of the 2nd Brigade, left Enghien, where they were quartered, at 3 a.m. on the morning of the 16th, for a twenty-five-mile march to Quatre Bras. They reached Quatre Bras at 4 p.m., by which time the battle had been engaged for two hours. The Coldstream Guards immediately deployed into position to support the 1st Foot Guards, who were engaged with the enemy at Bossu Wood. Once the wood was cleared of French, Lieutenant-Colonel James Macdonnell led the 2nd Brigade's light companies (including Graham's) in a counter-attack against Jérôme Bonaparte's Frenchmen, with other Guards companies in support. The various Guards battalions sustained heavy losses, but by 6.30 p.m. Wellington's position had strengthened. By 9 p.m., Ney had withdrawn his men, and Wellington held the field. The French had lost 4,000 men, the Allies 4,800.

Wellington held Quatre Bras, but the Prussians were not so successful at Ligny, and were forced to retreat. Hearing of Blücher's defeat on the morning of 17 June, Wellington ordered his army to withdraw level with his ally; they took position near the Belgian village of Waterloo. Graham's company, and the Scots Guards' light company, masked the retreat from the right, and did not leave Quatre Bras until mid-afternoon.

The field at Waterloo was 5.5 km wide, with two parallel ridges running west to east, creating a shallow valley 1.4 km across. On the allied right lay the chateau of Hougoumont, a collection of walled farm buildings lying closer to the French line than the Allies' line. Recognising its defensive importance, Wellington ordered Hanoverian and Nassau troops to occupy the farm. In allied hands, it would provide cover for flanking fire against any French assault of the main allied line; in French hands, it would provide a bastion from which they could launch attacks. Since it defended the Nivelles road as well as the Allies' right flank, Wellington ordered that it was to be held at all costs.

== Hougoumont ==
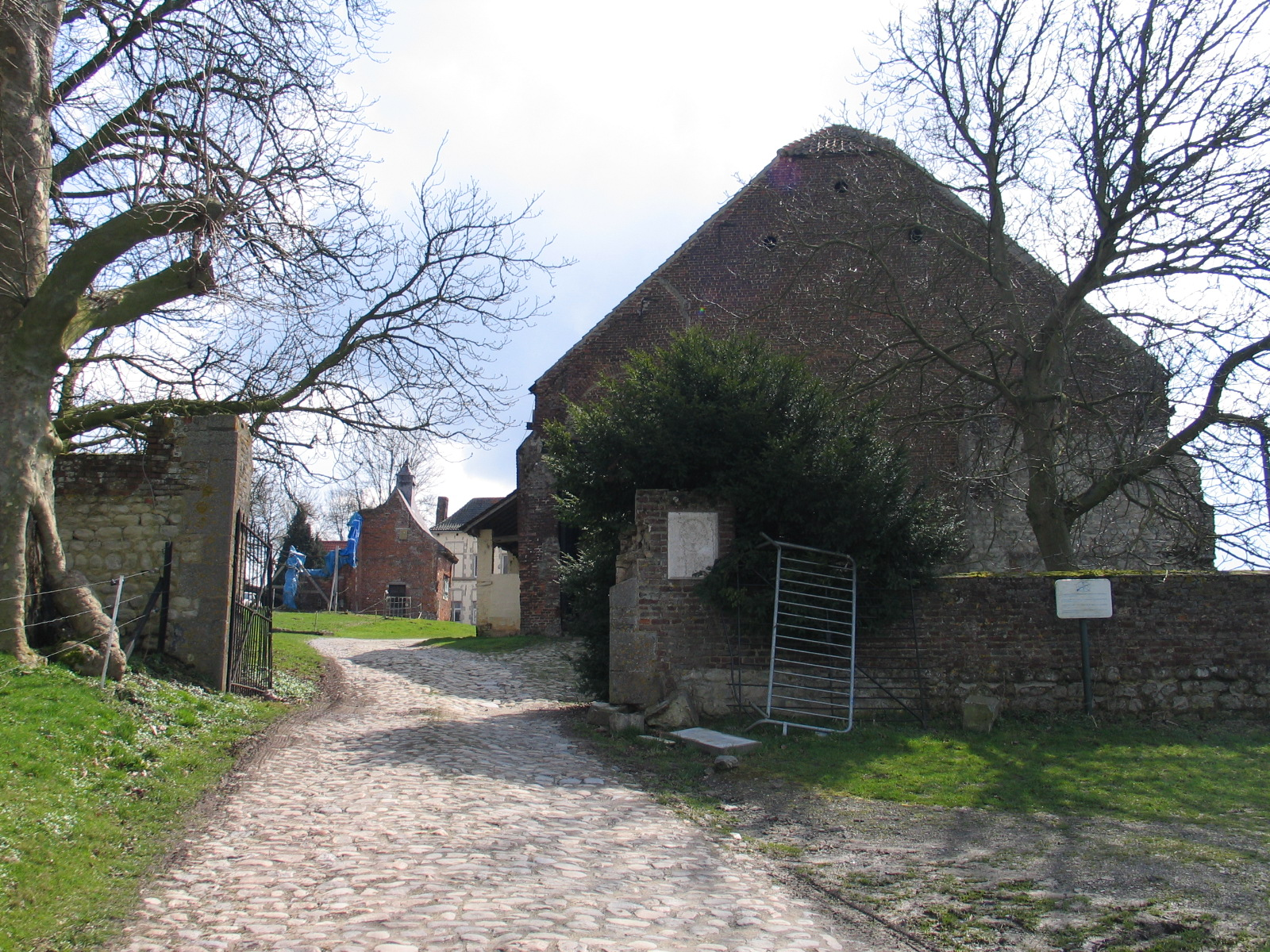
The north gate at Hougoumont in 2006. The walls are somewhat lower now than they were in 1815.

The day's battle began on 18 June 1815 at about 11 a.m. with a French attack on Hougoumont from the south-west, led by Napoleon's brother Jerome. The French gained control of much of the chateau's park, but the Allies retained possession of the farmhouse and courtyard surrounds. Jerome continued his attempts to take the farmhouse throughout the day, making four or five assaults, most of which were repulsed by the defenders, who fired through loopholes, windows, and doorways. One assault at about 12.30 p.m. breached the north gate, which had been left open to allow allied troop and supply movements. Sous-Lieutenant Legros, of the French 1st Light Infantry, broke through the wooden doors with an axe, allowing French soldiers to flood the courtyard. Graham's commanding officer, Lieutenant-Colonel James Macdonnell, led his men through the melee in the courtyard to the gates, in an attempt to shut them against the pressing French.

This was done with the help of three officers (Captain Wyndham, Ensign Hervey, and Ensign Gooch), Corporal Graham, and a few other soldiers including Graham's brother Joseph. James Graham was the one to slot the bar in place. Flagstones, carts, and debris were then piled against the gates to hold them secure. The Frenchmen trapped within the courtyard were all killed, apart from a young drummer-boy.

Wellington monitored the action at Hougoumont until about 1 p.m., by which time he was content enough with the position's security to concentrate his own attention on the allied centre.

With the chateau secure, the 3,500 British and German troops in the vicinity were able to defend the strongpoint against an estimated 14,500 French soldiers. About 8,000 French soldiers died attacking Hougoumont over the day.

During the battle, Graham also saved the life of Captain Wyndham – one of those who had shut the gate – by shooting a sniper whose musket was trained on the officer. Mid-afternoon, a fire broke out in one of the farm buildings following a bombardment of incendiary shells.

Graham's brother Joseph was lying wounded within, and Graham requested permission to fall out, so he might rescue his brother; given permission, he retrieved his brother and returned to his post. Joseph Graham died of wounds five days later.

At 7 p.m. the defenders at Hougoumont were still resisting, despite the burning buildings and their own dwindling ammunition. Within a couple of hours, the action in the rest of the field had resulted in a victory for the Allies: the French were in retreat. Afterwards, Wellington declared that "the success of the battle turned upon closing the gates at Hougoumont." It seems likely that if the gates had not been shut so quickly the men holding the perimeter at Hougoumont would have been killed. It was a costly defence: the Coldstream Guards lost 8 officers, with 300 casualties among the men. James Graham was promoted to sergeant for his bravery at Hougoumont, and received a special medal for gallantry.

== "The bravest man at Waterloo" ==
Wellington's respect for those who served in Hougoumont was well known. After the battle he wrote: "You may depend upon it, no troops could have held Hougoumont but the British, and only the best of them." But among those "best soldiers", Graham stood out as being exceptional. In August 1815, John Norcross, the Rector of Framlingham, sought to make over the income from a freehold farm to the "most deserving soldier at Waterloo"; he approached the Duke of Wellington, who nominated Graham. Graham received an annuity from the farm of £10 a year for two years until the vicar became bankrupt. Wellington's Supplementary Dispatches (Vol. 11) make mention of Graham:

[He] assisted Lieutenant-colonel Macdonnell in closing the gates, which had been left open for the purpose of communication, and which the enemy were in the act of forcing. His brother, a corporal in the regiment, was lying wounded in a barn, which was on fire, and Graham removed him so as to be secure from the fire, and then returned to his duty. He had been 3 2/12 years in the regiment.

This honour is noted in his service record now held at the Public Record Office, with the words: "The most valorous NCO at the battle of Waterloo selected by the Duke of Wellington."

The Reverend Norcross died in 1837. It was reported in a number of books and newspapers in the years following that Norcross had recovered his fortunes enough to leave £500 in his will to "the bravest man in England" and that, once appealed to, Wellington again turned to the events in Hougoumont, selecting Colonel Macdonnell. Macdonnell apparently split the bequest with Graham, since they had shut the gate together. There remains some doubt concerning this second bequest. Graham's entry in the Dictionary of National Biography records only the initial annuity, and states that "various apparently incorrect versions of the Norcross gift have been published." Archibald Murray (in 1862) made reference to "the alleged sum of £500" given to Colonel Macdonnell and reported investigations made by a fellow researcher who could find no proof of this bequest; Murray concluded that the reports arose from a misrepresentation of the original annuity. In his history of Waterloo, Colonel Siborne provided a full account of Graham's action at Hougoumont and the later annuity, but made no reference to the second bequest, despite reporting Graham's own death at Kilmainham Hospital. Siborne had personally interviewed Graham.

== Later career ==
Graham continued to serve in the Coldstream Guards after Waterloo. The 2nd Battalion advanced on Paris with the army, remaining there until 1816 as part of the army of occupation, after which they were posted to Cambrai. In November 1818 they returned to England. Graham was discharged from the Guards in 1821, and enlisted in the 12th Royal Lancers as a private. When Graham joined the Lancers, they were stationed in Ireland, and returned to England in 1824. In 1826, two squadrons saw service in Portugal before returning to England. Graham was discharged for ill health – "an injured chest and worn out" – in July 1830, and received a Chelsea pension.

James Graham died in 1845, at the Royal Hospital, Kilmainham. He was buried with military honours. A memorial plaque was erected at the Hospital, and it was later transferred to St Tiernach's Church, in Clones.

His obituary appeared in The Gentleman's Magazine under the name "John Graham":

23 April. At the Royal Hospital of Kilmainham, Sergeant John Graham, formerly in the light company of the 2nd battalion of Coldstream Guards, the individual selected by the Duke of Wellington as "the bravest of the brave" in the desperate combat at Waterloo, in order to profit by the generous offer of the Rev. Mr. Norcross, Rector of Framlingham, to confer a pension, during life, upon the soldier most distinguished in the brigade of guards on that glorious day. After the most minute inquiry, carried out by Sir John Byng's directions, the laurel was awarded to an Irishman, John Graham, a native of Cloona [sic], co. Monaghan.

== Enduring legacy ==
James Graham's exploits at Waterloo became much celebrated throughout Great Britain, and many accounts of the battle make reference to his actions, including a biography of Wellington, the memoirs of another sergeant, and Charles Dickens' magazine Household Words. The shutting of the gate was portrayed by artist Robert Gibb in 1903; the painting is currently held by the National Museums of Scotland. A watercolour portrait of Sergeant Graham himself is held at the National Gallery of Ireland.

The actions of Graham and Macdonnell continue to be remembered as an iconic moment in the battle of Waterloo. In 1915, cigarette manufacturers W.D. & H.O. Wills portrayed Graham and Macdonnell on one of the cigarette cards printed to commemorate the centenary of Waterloo. Since then, many authors of fiction concerning Waterloo have recreated the events at the gate, and even if they include their own fictional heroes they attribute the closing of the gate to Macdonnell and Graham.

The efforts of the Coldstream Guards at Waterloo, and Graham's gallantry, remain celebrated by the Regiment. Every December the Sergeants' Mess commemorate Graham's bravery with a ceremonial game "Hanging the Brick". The "Brick" – a stone from Hougoumont – is paraded through the barracks and hung up in the Sergeants' Mess with all the honour due to regimental colours. Also retained by the Regiment are Graham's Waterloo Medal and gallantry medal. In 2004 the Regiment named a new sergeants' accommodation block after him, in Lille Barracks, Aldershot. A plaque on the building is inscribed with the words:

"In Memory of Sergeant James Graham WM, 2nd Battalion Coldstream Guards, "The Bravest Man in England", Following His Actions in Closing The Gates at Hougoumont Farm, Waterloo, 18 June 1815."
