= James Macdonell (British Army officer) =

Scottish officer of the British Army

General Sir James Macdonell GCB KCH
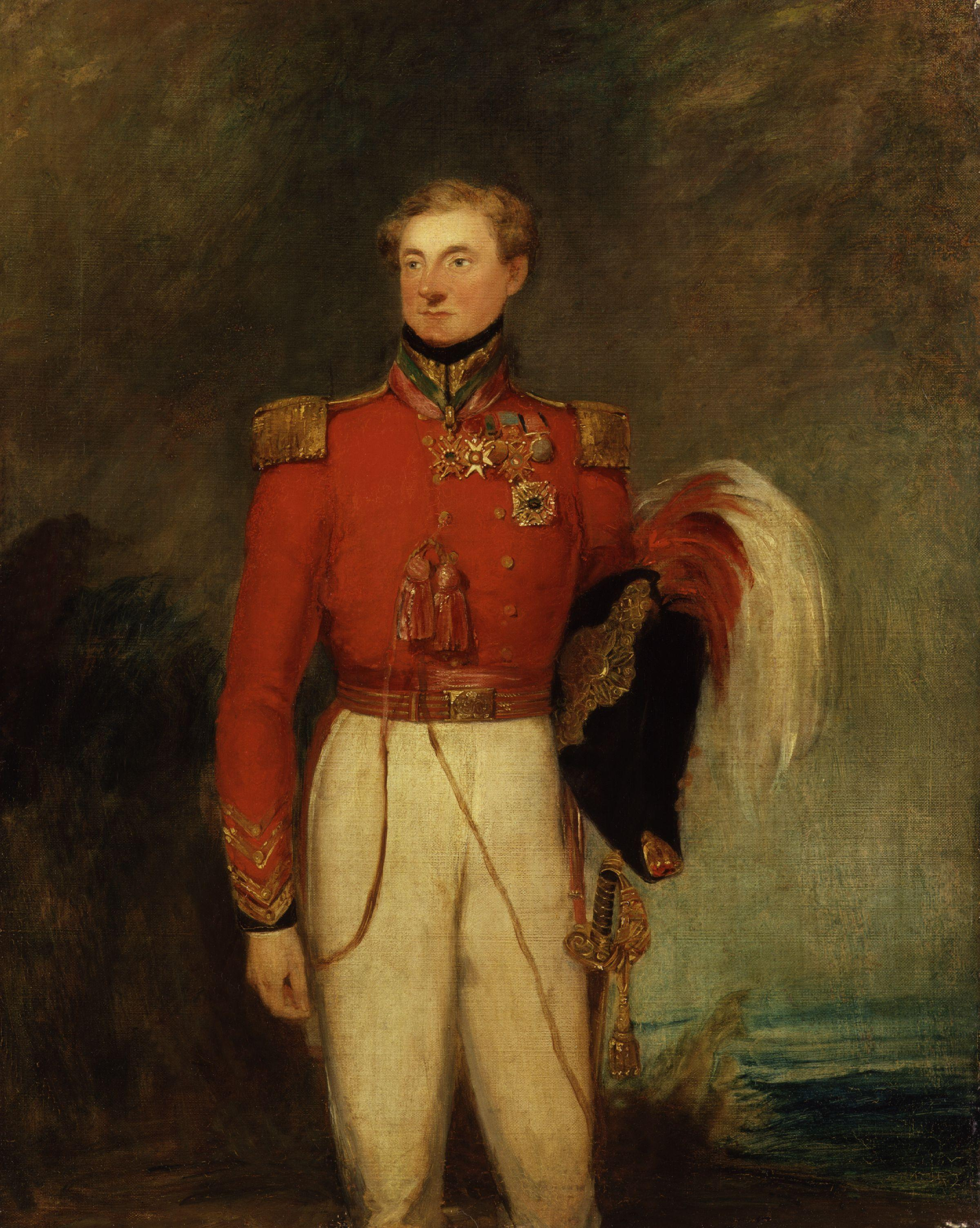
- Portrait by William Salter
- Born: 1781
- Died: 15 May 1857 (aged 75–76) London, England

General Sir James Macdonell GCB KCH (1781 – 15 May 1857) was a Scottish officer of the British Army.

== Life ==
He was the third son of Duncan MacDonell, 14th clan chief of Clan MacDonell of Glengarry and his wife, Marjory Grant, daughter of Sir Ludovic Grant. Alexander Ranaldson Macdonell of Glengarry was his elder brother.

He was educated at a Roman Catholic school in Douai in France, as was then common with some of the Catholic highland Scottish aristocracy (Catholic educational institutions being illegal in Scotland).

He died in London on 15 May 1857.

== Military career ==
He began as an ensign in 1793. In 1794 (aged only 13), he was a lieutenant in the 78th (Highlanders) Regiment of Foot; in 1795, he was captain in the 17th Dragoons.

He joined the 19th Foot in 1796; he was major in the 78th Foot, and was awarded the Army Gold Medal for Maida in 1806. He joined the Coldstream Guards in 1811 as a lieutenant colonel, and served in the Peninsular War.

He is best known for his command of the infantry defending the Hougoumont farmhouse at the Battle of Waterloo in 1815, where he fought with great distinction, including leading the vital closing of the gates, with his sergeant, James Graham. The farmhouse had around 1,000 defending it against a French force of 2,500. MacDonell was wounded slightly in the battle.

The Duke of Wellington awarded him £1,000 for his part in the battle calling him "the bravest man in the British Army". MacDonell insisted on splitting this money with his sergeant, James Graham.

In 1830, he was promoted to major general and posted to Ireland, where in 1837 he had to abate the troubles in Armagh.

He commanded the Brigade of Guards in Lower Canada under Lord Durham from 1838 to 1841. He returned to Britain in 1842 and was then successively given the colonelcy of the 79th Regiment of Foot (Cameron Highlanders) from 1842 to 1849 and the 71st (Highland) Regiment of Foot from 1849 until his death in 1857. He was promoted full general in 1854.

== Awards ==
He was awarded Order of the Bath, Knight's Cross of Maria Theresa, and Royal Guelphic Order for his service at Waterloo. He was appointed GCB in 1855.

== Sources ==
- Julian Paget & Derek Saunders (1992); Hougoumont: The Key to Victory at Waterloo; Pen and Sword Books (paperback 2001) ISBN 0-85052-716-3

Military offices
Preceded by Sir Thomas Arbuthnot	Colonel of the 71st (Highland) Regiment of Foot; 1849–1857	Succeeded by Sir Thomas Erskine Napier
Preceded by Hon. John Ramsay	Colonel of the 79th Regiment of Foot (Cameron Highlanders); 1842–1849	Succeeded by James Hay
