= Pierre François Bauduin =

French general (1768–1815)

Baron of the Empire Pierre François Bauduin
- Bauduin's family crest
- Born: 25 January 1768; Liancourt, Somme, France
- Died: 18 June 1815 (aged 47); Château d'Hougoumont, Waterloo, Belgium
- Cause of death: Musket fire
- Military career
- Allegiance: French First Republic; First French Empire
- Branch: French Revolutionary Army; French Imperial Army; French Imperial Navy
- Service years: 1792 – 1815
- Rank: Brigadier general
- Wars: French Revolutionary Wars; War of the First Coalition; Siege of Toulon; Italian Campaign of 1796-1797; War of the Second Coalition; Battle of Montebello; Battle of Marengo (WIA); Napoleonic Wars; War of the Fifth Coalition; Battle of Aspern-Essling; French invasion of Russia; Battle of Borodino (WIA); War of the Sixth Coalition; German campaign; Battle of Bautzen; Battle of Lützen; Waterloo campaign; Battle of Quatre Bras; Battle of Waterloo †
- Awards: Legion of Honour; Order of Saint Louis

Pierre François Bauduin (25 January 1768 – 18 June 1815) was a French general during the French Revolutionary and Napoleonic Wars. Bauduin, who served in the Russian and Italian campaigns during the Napoleonic Wars, commanded a brigade in Jérôme Bonaparte's division at the Battle of Waterloo, where he would die at Hougoumont.

Bauduin served in the French Revolutionary and Imperial armies for most of his career in the military, although he served in the French Imperial Navy from 1805 to 1807. During his time in the army, he became a Baron of the Empire in 1810 and received the Order of Saint Louis in 1814.

== Military career ==
Bauduin joined the French Army on September 11 of 1792 as a second lieutenant. Throughout his career, he was promoted through the ranks of lieutenant, capitaine, chef de bataillon, colonel, and finally brigadier general in the years 1795, 1796, 1800, 1809, and 1813, respectively. On 22 October 1810, he was made a Baron of the Empire. He was made a member of the Legion of Honour in 1804, promoted to officer in 1809, and eventually became commander in 1812. From 1805 to 1807, he temporarily served in the French Navy under Pierre-Charles Villeneuve.

On August 11, 1813, Bauduin assumed command of the Pyrenees-Orientales, a department in Occitania. He fought in numerous land engagements during his career. These were the 1793 Siege of Toulon against the Royalists, English, and Spanish during the War of the First Coalition; the 1800 Battle of Montebello and Battle of Marengo against the Austrians during the War of the Second Coalition; the 1809 Battle of Aspern-Essling against the Austrians during the War of the Fifth Coalition; and the narrowly won 1812 Battle of Borodino against the Russian Empire during the Russian campaign.

Other battles he was involved in include the victorious 1813 battles of Bautzen and Lützen, fought against the Russian Empire and Prussia during the War of the Sixth Coalition. He was injured by bullet wounds several times, particularly in his left thigh at Marengo, and in his right arm at Borodino. He also served in several divisions and armies, like the Grande Armée (including the 59th Line Infantry Regiment, 118th, 32nd, and 16th Line Demi-Brigades, 21st Infantry Division of the VI Corps, and 7th Provisional Division of the Young Guard Infantry) and the Army of Germany.

=== Death ===
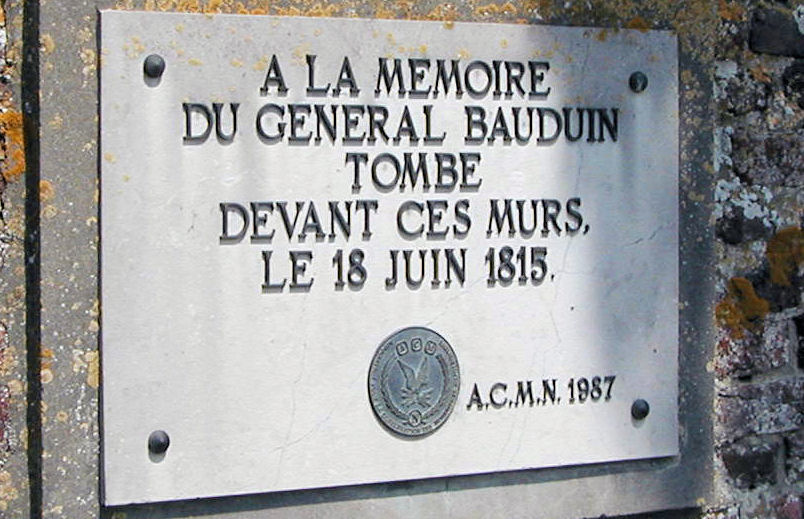
Bauduin's commemorative plaque at Hougoumont

After Napoleon's abdication in 1814, Bauduin received the Order of Saint Louis from the ruling Bourbon dynasty and was retained in the army. During the Hundred Days, Bauduin returned to Napoleon's service. He commanded the 1st Brigade in Jérôme Bonaparte's division (6th) of the II Corps during the Waterloo Campaign, fighting at the Battle of Quatre Bras in modern-day Belgium on 16 June 1815.

By the time the Battle of Waterloo began, Bauduin was in control of the 1st Light and 3rd Line Infantry, both of which were very engrossed in the fighting. He was killed at Waterloo on 18 June 1815 during combat at Hougoumont in modern Belgium. He was one of the first casualties, struck by musket fire from the windows of a gardener's house after he and his allies passed through an oak wooden gate. He was on a horse. This event took place sometime around 11:30 A.M, when an artillery battle was ensuing, and Jérôme and Bauduin were leading their soldiers through a forest. In the forest, which had around 1,000 light troops stationed within its area, Bauduin was supporting Jérôme's efforts with three companies from the 3rd Infantry and six from the 1st Light. In 1987, a plaque was erected on the wall in front of which he was shot.

== See also ==
- List of French generals of the Revolutionary and Napoleonic Wars

== Bibliography ==
- Bonaparte, Napoleon (1911). Ordres et apostilles de Napoléon 1er (1799-1815) [Orders and Apostilles of Napoleon I (1799-1815)] (in French). Vol. 2. Paris: Honoré Champion.
- Burnham, Robert; McGuigan, Ron (30 November 2018). "Chapter 7: 16 June 1815 Quatre Bras". Wellington's Foot Guards at Waterloo: The Men Who Saved the Day Against Napoleon. Barnsley, England: Pen & Sword Books. ISBN 978-1-5267-0988-2.
- Buttery, David (20 May 2013). "Chapter 3: The Struggle for Hougoumont". Waterloo Battlefield Guide. Barnsley, England: Pen & Sword Military. ISBN 9781783035137. Archived from the original on 3 December 2024.
- Charavay, Jacques; Charavay, Étienne (1893). Les généraux morts pour la patrie: 1792-1871; notices biographiques [The Generals Who Died for the Country: 1792-1871; Biographical Notices] (in French). Paris: Au Siége de la Société.
- Cornwell, Bernard (2015). Waterloo: The History of Four Days, Three Armies and Three Battles. London: HarperCollins Publishers. ISBN 978-0-06-231206-8.
- Mullié, Charles (1851). Biographie des célébrités militaires des armées de terre et de mer de 1789 à 1850 [Biography of Military Celebrities of the Armies of the Land and Sea from 1789 to 1850] (in French). ISBN 978-1246514599.
- Six, Georges (1934). "Baudin (Pierre-François, baron)". Dictionnaire biographique des généraux et amiraux français de la Révolution et de l'Empire: 1792–1814 (in French). Vol. 1. Paris: Librairie Historique et Nobilaire. p. 62.
- Uffindell, Andrew; Corum, Michael (1 November 2002). On The Fields Of Glory: The Battlefields of the 1815 Campaign. London, England; Mechanicsburg, Pennsylvania: Frontline Books. ISBN 978-1-85367-514-0.
