= Robert Dighton =

English painter (c.1752 – 1814)

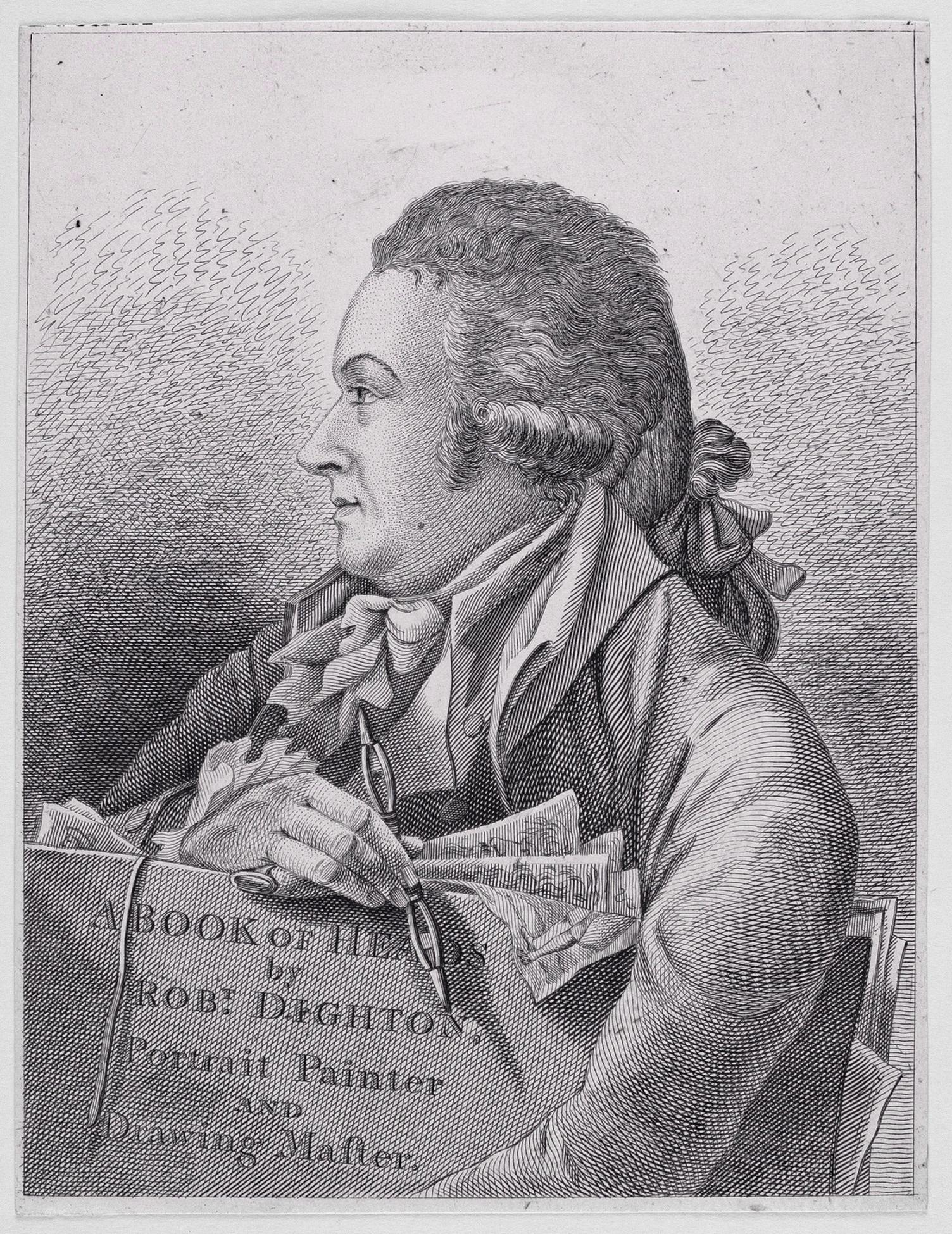
- Etching from a self-portrait, circa 1787
- Born: 1751, 1752; London
- Died: 1814; London
- Occupations: Caricaturist, painter, printmaker, drawer, singer, graphic artist, art educator, actor
- Children: Richard Dighton, Denis Dighton, Robert Dighton

Robert Dighton (c.1752 – 1814) was an English portrait painter, printmaker, and caricaturist. He was the founder of a dynasty of artists who followed in his footsteps.

== Life and work ==
Robert Dighton was the son of London printseller John Dighton. In the 1770s he began acting and singing in plays at the Haymarket Theatre, Covent Garden, and Sadler’s Wells while at the same time training and exhibiting at the Royal Academy, whose school he entered in 1772. He also exhibited at the Free Society of Artists between 1769–73. The first prints he designed were of actors for John Bell's edition of Shakespeare (1775–76).

As an artist, he was first offered consistent employment by the publisher Carington Bowles (fl. 1752–93). This was the heyday of the so-called 'droll' mezzotint (amusing prints based on social situations rather than political or topical events) and Dighton's designs, executed in watercolour and then engraved, were an integral part of Bowles’s stock. Carington Bowles was also among London's most active mapsellers of his day, which goes some way to explaining the inclusion of some caricature maps by Dighton in Bowles’s Geography Bewitched! series, including those of Ireland, England, Wales, and Scotland.

Much of Dighton's early work was issued anonymously, but by the early 1790s it became increasingly well known, so he began etching and publishing under his own name. In awkward poses with ruddy faces, Dighton's satirical caricatures included lawyers, military officers, actors and actresses, and even down-at-heel types. In 1795 he brought out a Book of Heads and thenceforth devoted himself chiefly to caricature. His work is less biting than that of his contemporaries James Gilray and George Cruikshank.

By the start of the century, his success allowed him to open a shop in Charing Cross, where he sold his own prints and those of others until it emerged in 1806 that part of his stock was stolen from the British Museum. An art dealer by the name of Samuel Woodburn had purchased a print, an impression of Rembrandt's Coach Landscape, from Dighton and, supposing it might be a copy, took the print to the British Museum to compare it with the impression there. When it was discovered that their impression was missing, Dighton confessed that he had befriended a museum official by drawing portraits of him and his daughter during his visits and used this relationship to remove prints from the museum hidden in his portfolio.

Because of his co-operation, Dighton escaped prosecution, but he was forced to lie low in Oxford until the scandal died down. While there, as well as in Bath and Cambridge, he did an amusing series of portraits of academic types and country gentlemen. Returning to London in 1810, he reopened his studio, where he worked with his sons until his death in 1814.

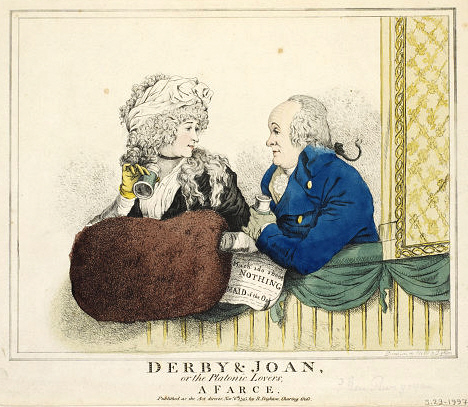
A satirical image of Elizabeth Farren and Edward Smith Stanley, 12th Earl of Derby, 1795

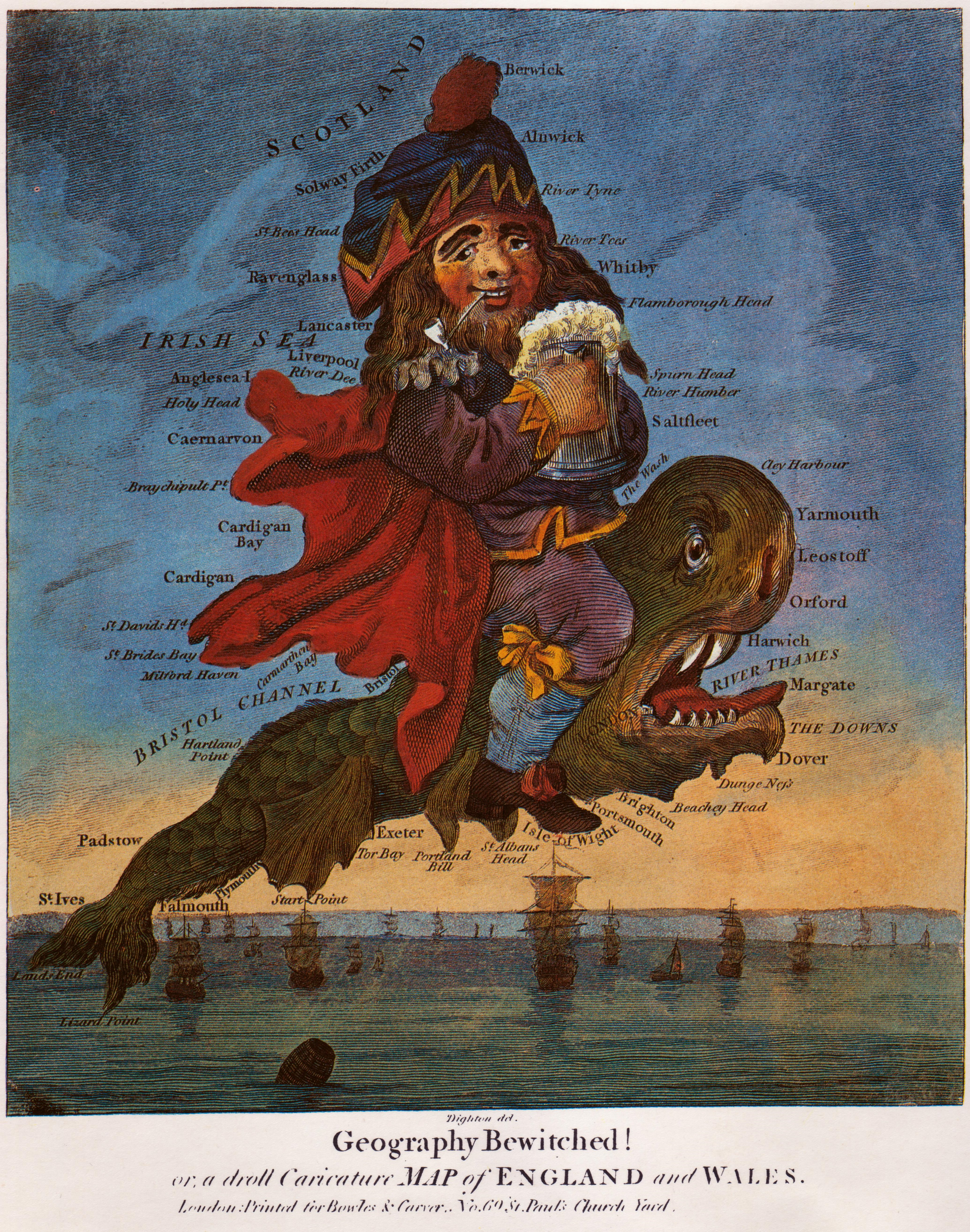
Geography Bewitched!

== The second and third generations ==
Sons

- Robert Jr (1786–1865) etched military portraits between 1800–09, then made a career in the military.
- Denis (1792–1827) began in the military, then trained as an artist. He specialised in military subjects.
- Richard (1796?–1880) was first an apprentice to his father, whose business he continued after his death. Then he moved it and his family to Cheltenham and Worcester.

Grandsons

- Richard Dighton Jr (1824–1891), Richard's elder son, established himself later in life as a photographer with a studio in Cheltenham.
- Joshua Dighton (1831–1908), Richard's second son, was born in Worcester. Well known for his portraits of jockeys, he was active in the London area as a portraitist and photographer.
