= The Defence of Hougoumont =

Painting by Denis Dighton

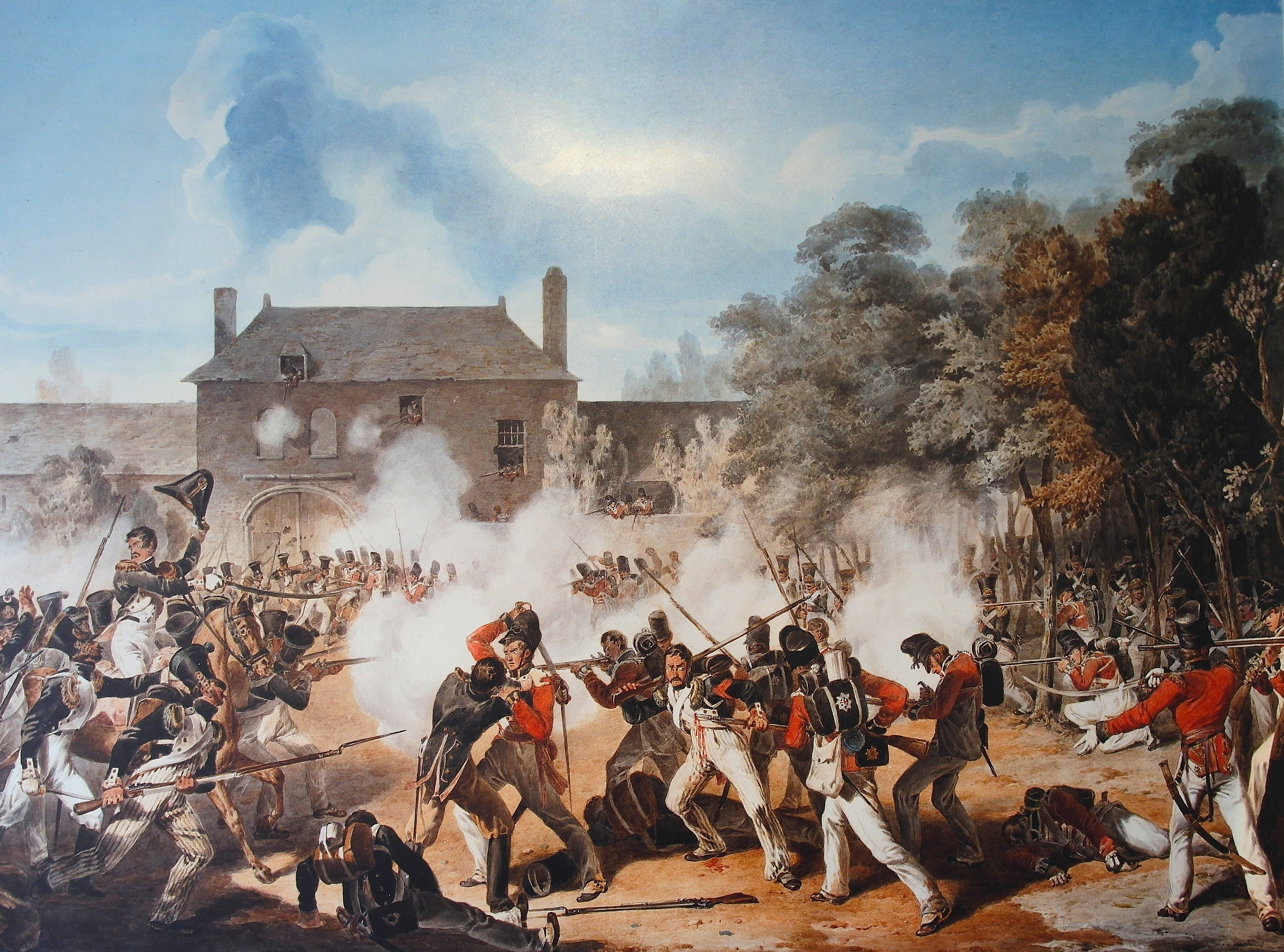
- Artist: Denis Dighton
- Year: 1815
- Type: Watercolour on canvas, history painting
- Dimensions: 196 cm × 173 cm (77.1 in × 68.1 in)
- Location: National Army Museum; London

The Defence of Hougoumont is an 1815 history painting by the British artist Denis Dighton. It portrays the fighting around Hougoumont on 18 June 1815 during the Battle of Waterloo.

Waterloo was the final major battle of the Napoleonic Wars. Hougoumont, a walled farmhouse, was one of the key strategic points of the battlefield along with La Haye Sainte. It was garrisoned by Allies forces, who faced repeated French attacks to seize it during the day. The painting focuses on a detachment of the Coldstream Guards engaged in fierce fighting with the French Army.

Dighton, known for his paintings of military scenes, visited the battlefield not long after the fighting and sketched it extensively and produced a number of depictions of the campaign. He was appointed "military painter to the Prince of Wales". Today the painting is in the National Army Museum in London.

== See also ==
- The Field of Waterloo, an 1818 painting by J.M.W. Turner depicting the aftermath of the fighting Hougoumont

== Bibliography ==
- Black, Jeremy. Introduction to Global Military History: 1775 to the Present Day. Taylor & Francis, 2006.
- Hichberger, J.W.M. Images of the Army: The Military in British Art, 1815-1914. Manchester University Press, 2017.
- Paget, Julian. & Saunders, Derek. Hougoumont: The Key to Victory at Waterloo. Leo Cooper, 1992.
