= Denis Dighton =

English artist (1792–1827)

Denis Dighton (1792 – 8 August 1827) was an English artist who specialised in military art.

== Life ==
Denis Dighton was the son of the caricaturist Robert Dighton; one his younger brothers was Richard Dighton. He enrolled as a student of the Royal Academy in 1807 and exhibited 17 pictures there between 1811 and 1825.

He enjoyed the patronage of the Prince of Wales, who had been a close friend of his mother. Through the influence of the prince, he received a commission in the army in 1811, however, he soon returned to civilian life. By 1814 he had received the title of Military Painter to H.R.H. the Prince Regent. The prince sent Dighton to the Southern Netherlands just before the Battle of Waterloo, and seems to have bought all his exhibited pictures. Dighton visited the Waterloo battlefield five days after the victory and executed nine paintings of the battle.

He fell from royal favour when his intermediary with the Prince Regent, Sir Benjamin Bloomfield, lost his place in the royal household, to be replaced by Sir William Knighton. After this loss of patronage, Dighton became mentally ill; he moved with his wife and son to Brittany, where he lived supported by the Artists' Benevolent Fund until his death at the age of 35 on 8 August 1827.

Dighton is mostly known for his paintings of battle scenes especially depicting the Peninsular War and Waterloo; he also painted a scene of Nelson being shot at the Battle of Trafalgar.

He married a sister of Augustus Earle, Phoebe Earle, herself a working artist and exhibitor at the Royal Academy who became Flower Painter in Ordinary to Queen Adelaide, in 1812 and they had two sons.

== Gallery ==
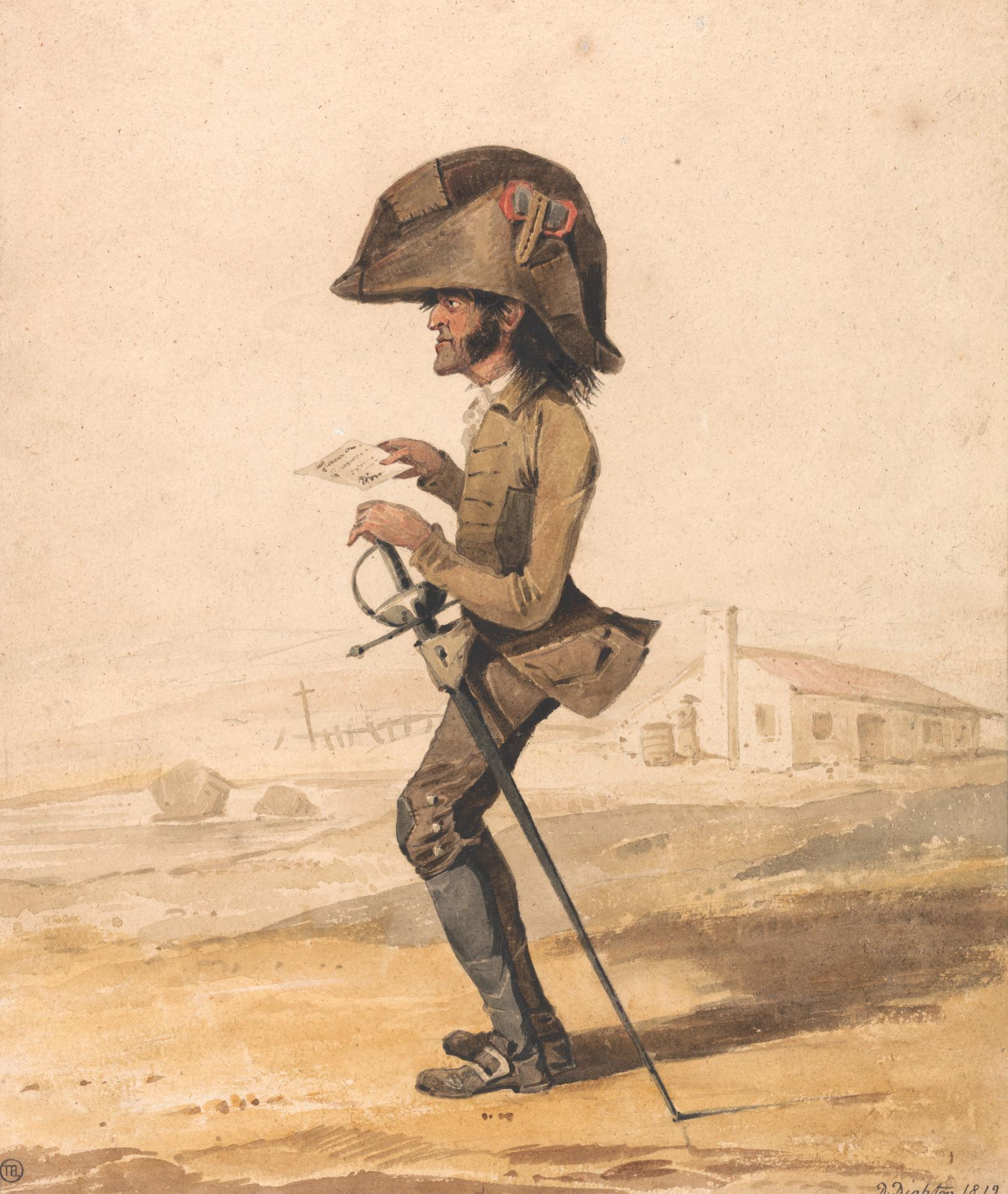
Caricature of a French military officer (1812)

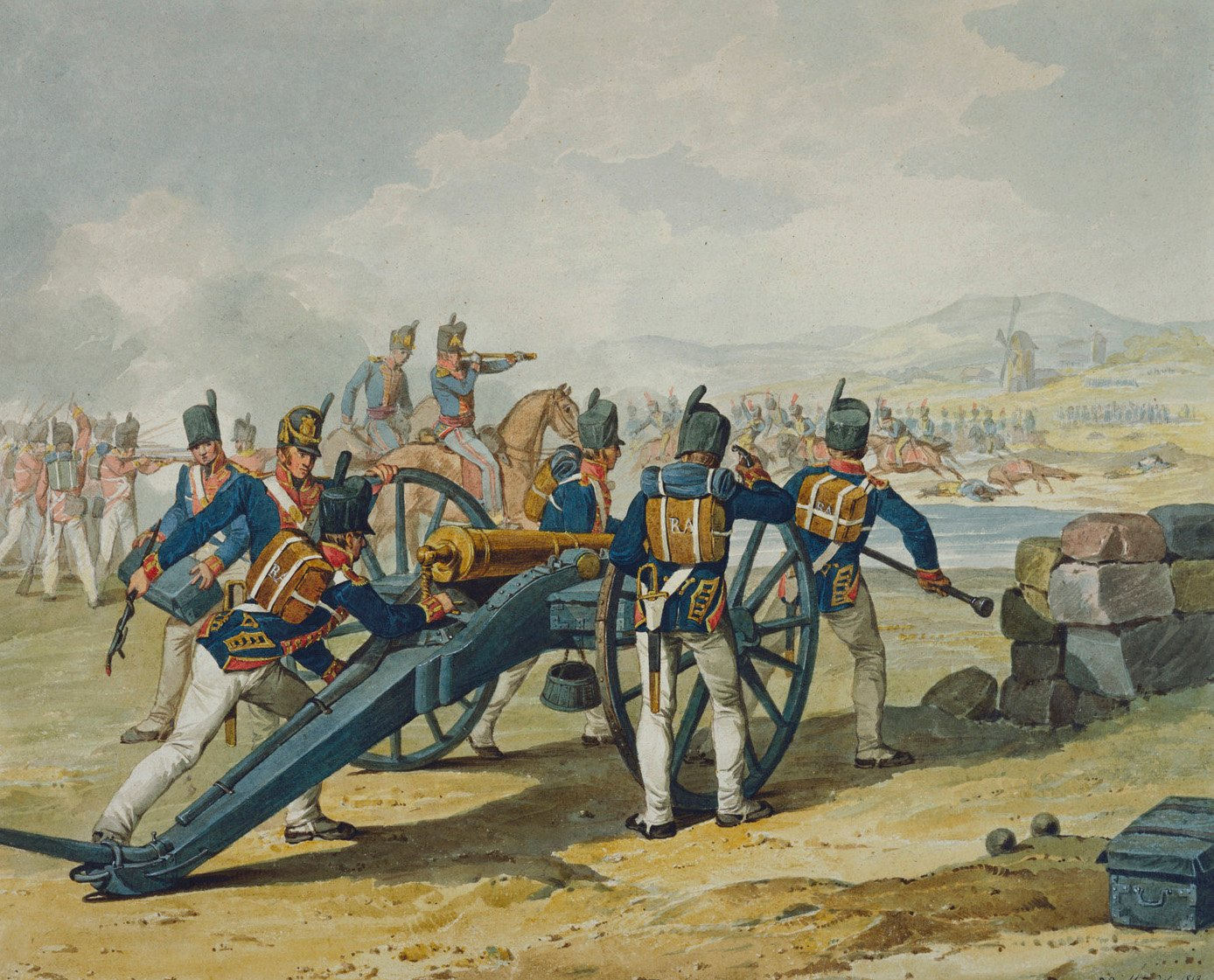
Royal Artillery Dislodging French Cavalry (1813)

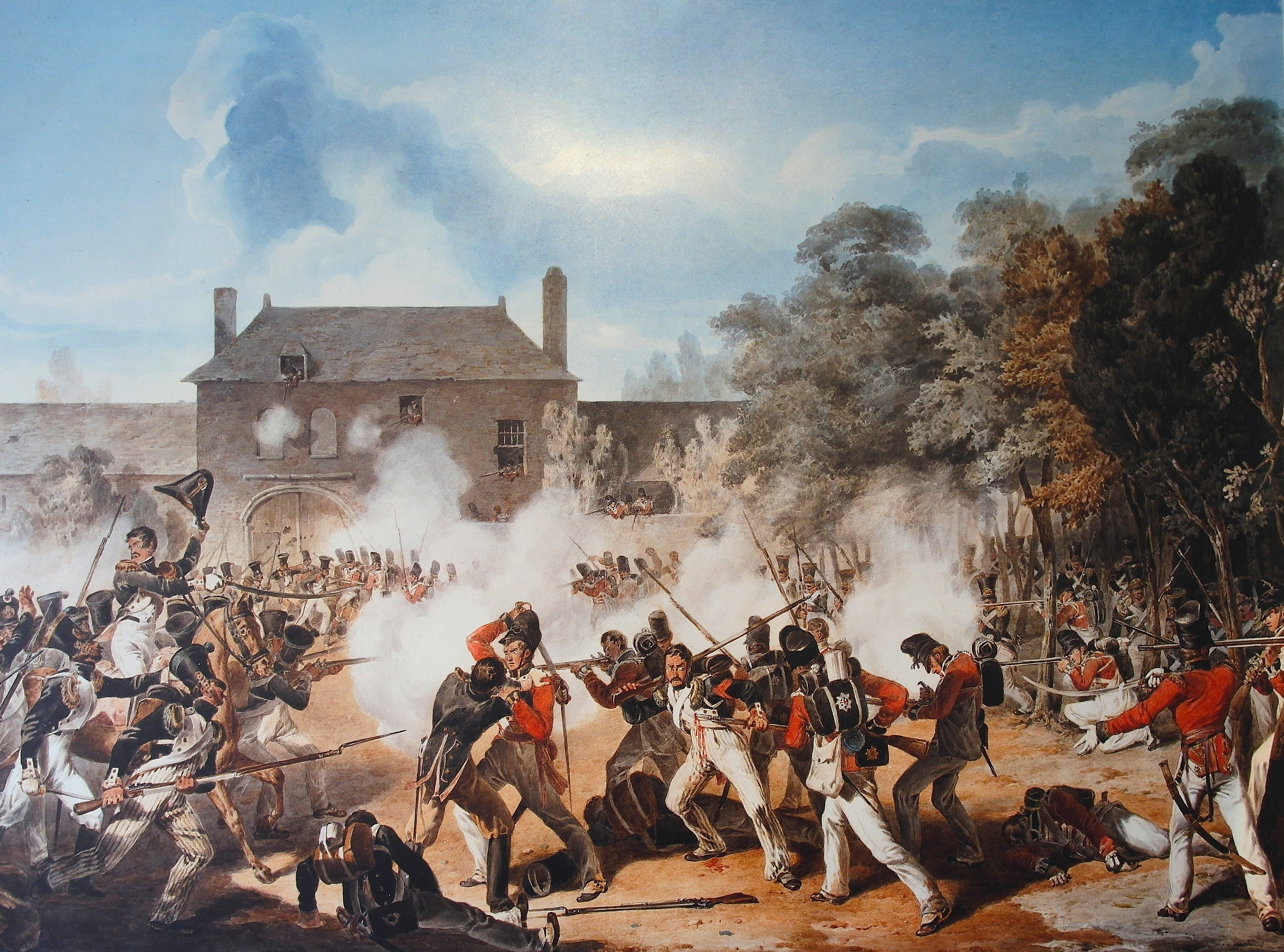
The Defence of Hougoumont (1815)

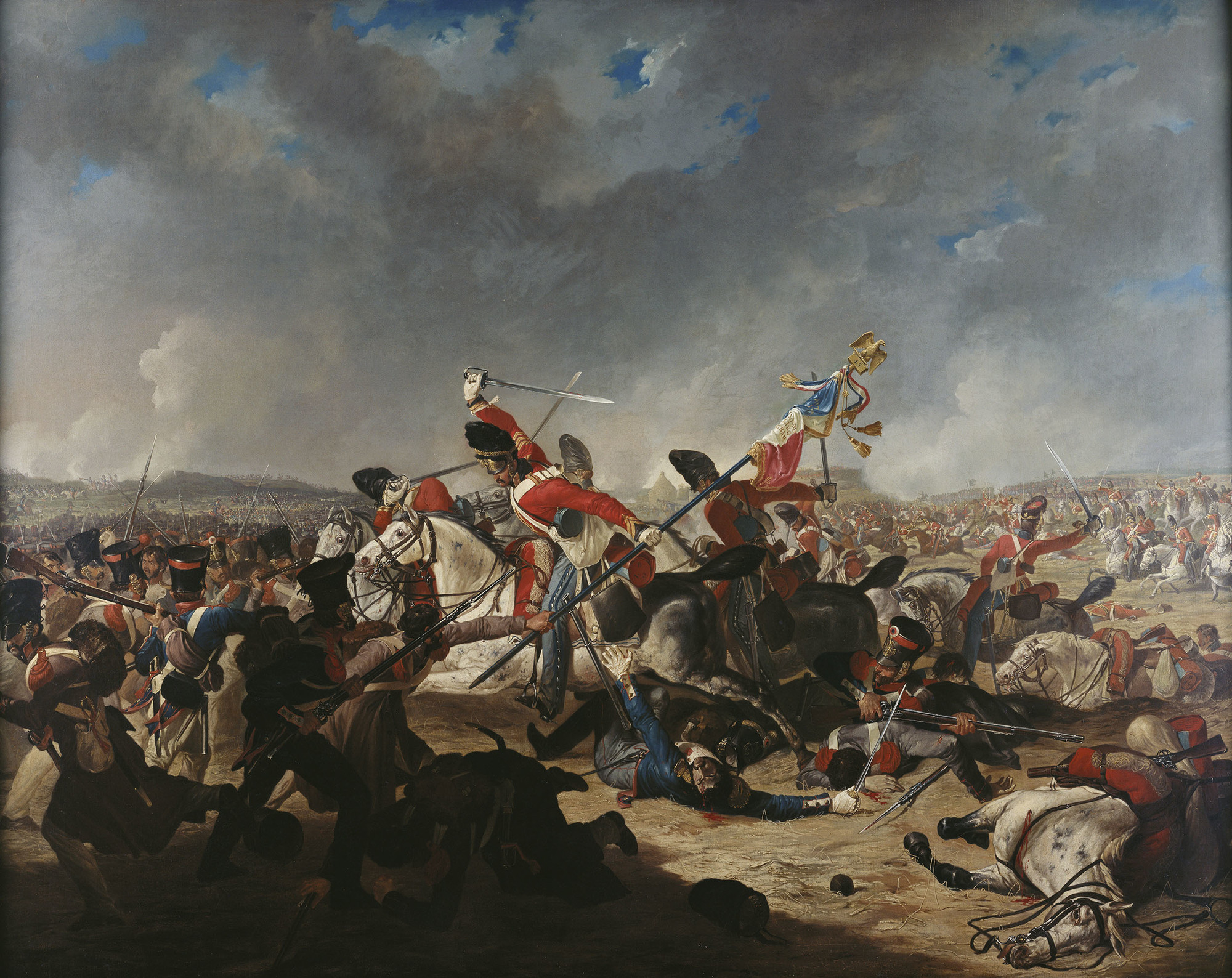
The Battle of Waterloo, The Charge of the Second Brigade of Cavalry (c. 1816)

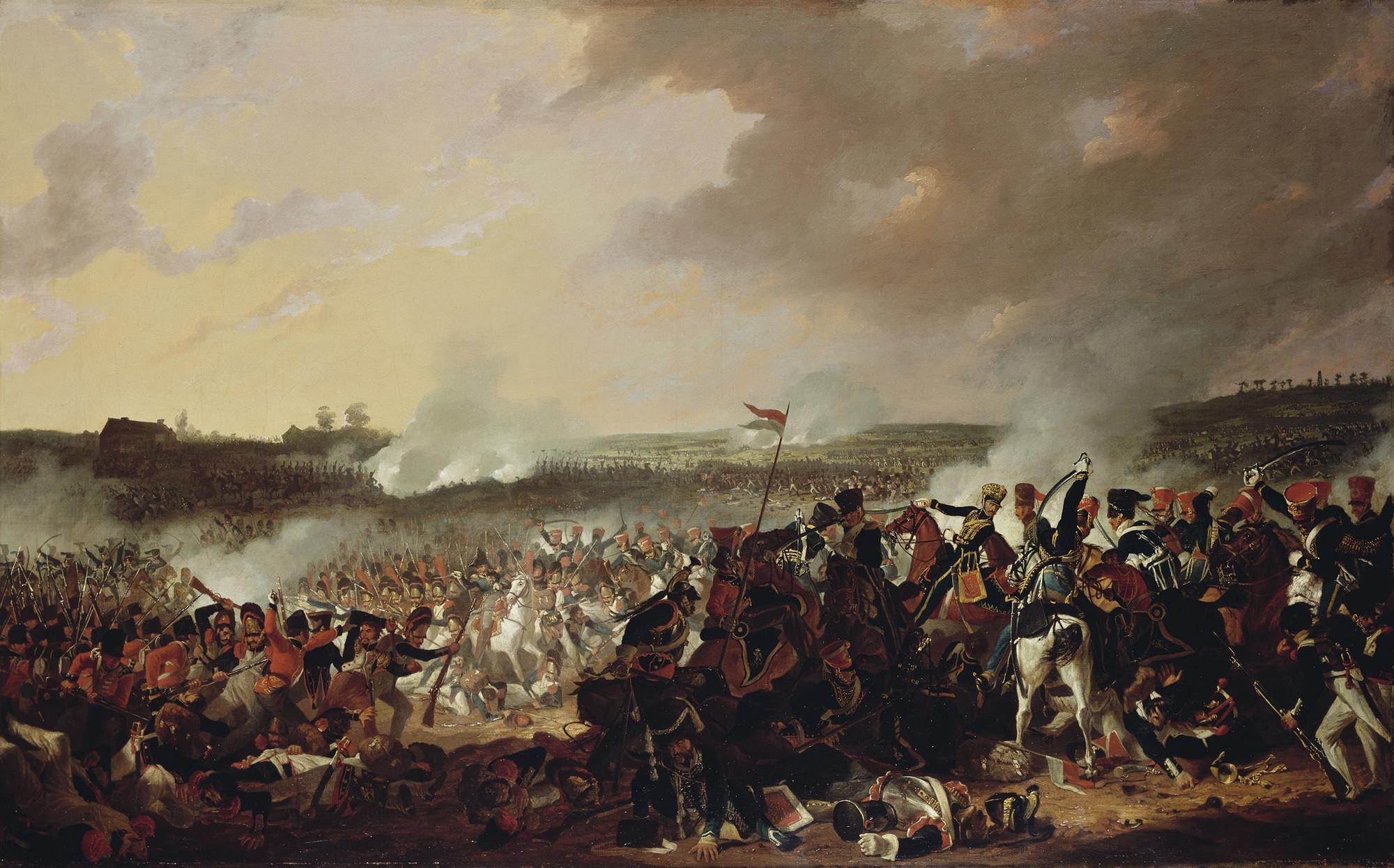
The Battle of Waterloo, General Advance of the British Lines (1816)

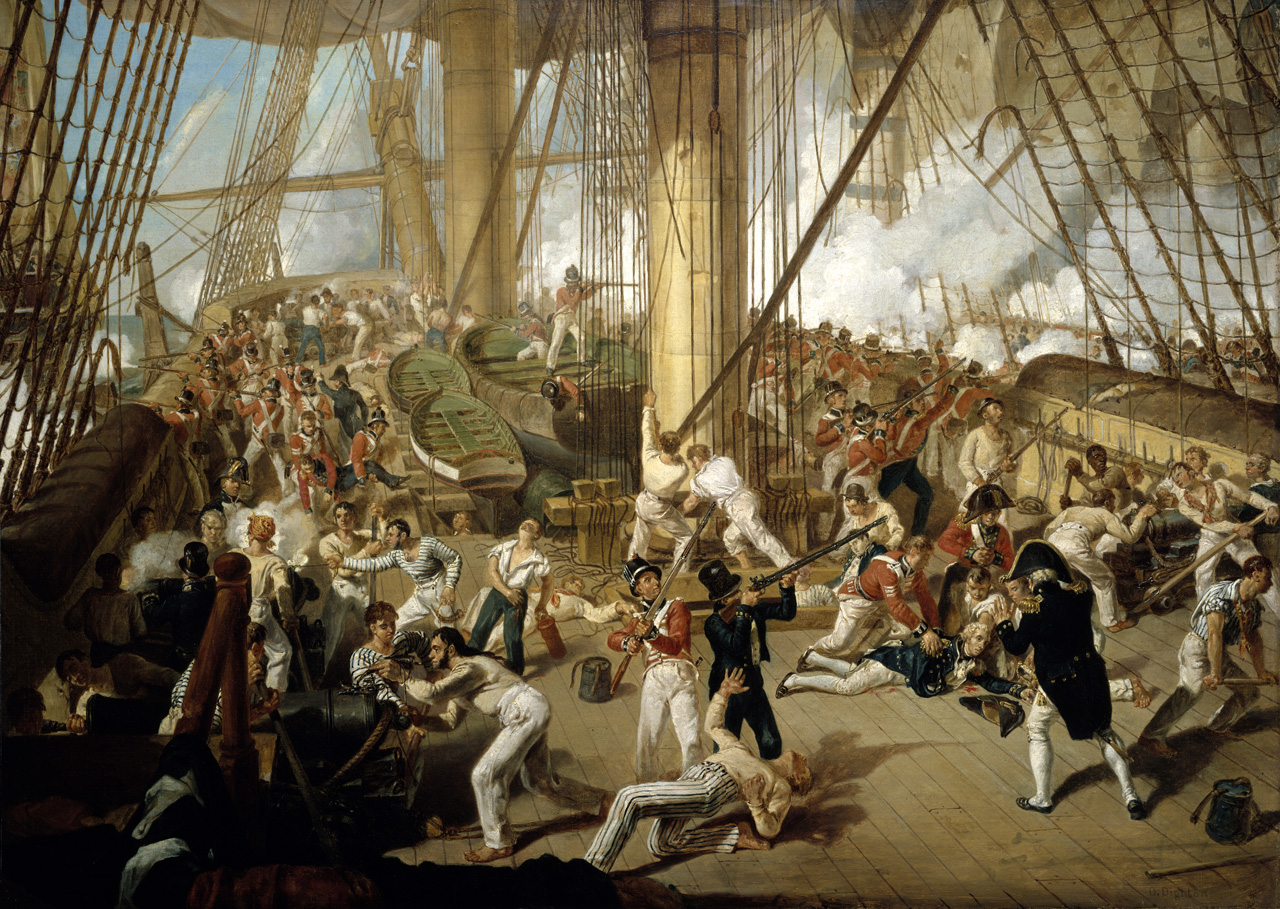
The Fall of Nelson, Battle of Trafalgar, 21 October 1805 (c. 1825)

== Works ==
- The Storming of San Sebastian on the 31st of August (1814 - National Trust for Scotland, Leith Hall)
- Battle of Orthes (1815 - Marquess of Anglesey)
- The Defence of Hougoumont (1815 - National Army Museum)
- The Battle of Waterloo (1816 - Marquess of Anglesey)
- Waterloo - Charge of the Second Brigade of Cavalry (1817)
- Battle of Waterloo (attributed)
- Greeks and Turks. Defeat of the Turks in the Defile of Klissura (1823 - Private Collection)

== Works about ==
- Carman, William Y., "The Battle of Waterloo by Denis Dighton," Journal of the Society for Army Historical Research, Vol. XLIII, No. 174, June 1965, pp. 55–59.
- Harrington, Peter. (1993). British Artists and War: The Face of Battle in Paintings and Prints, 1700-1914. London: Greenhill
