= Guadalajara Centro metro station =

Light rail station in Guadalajara, Jalisco, Mexico

Guadalajara Centro
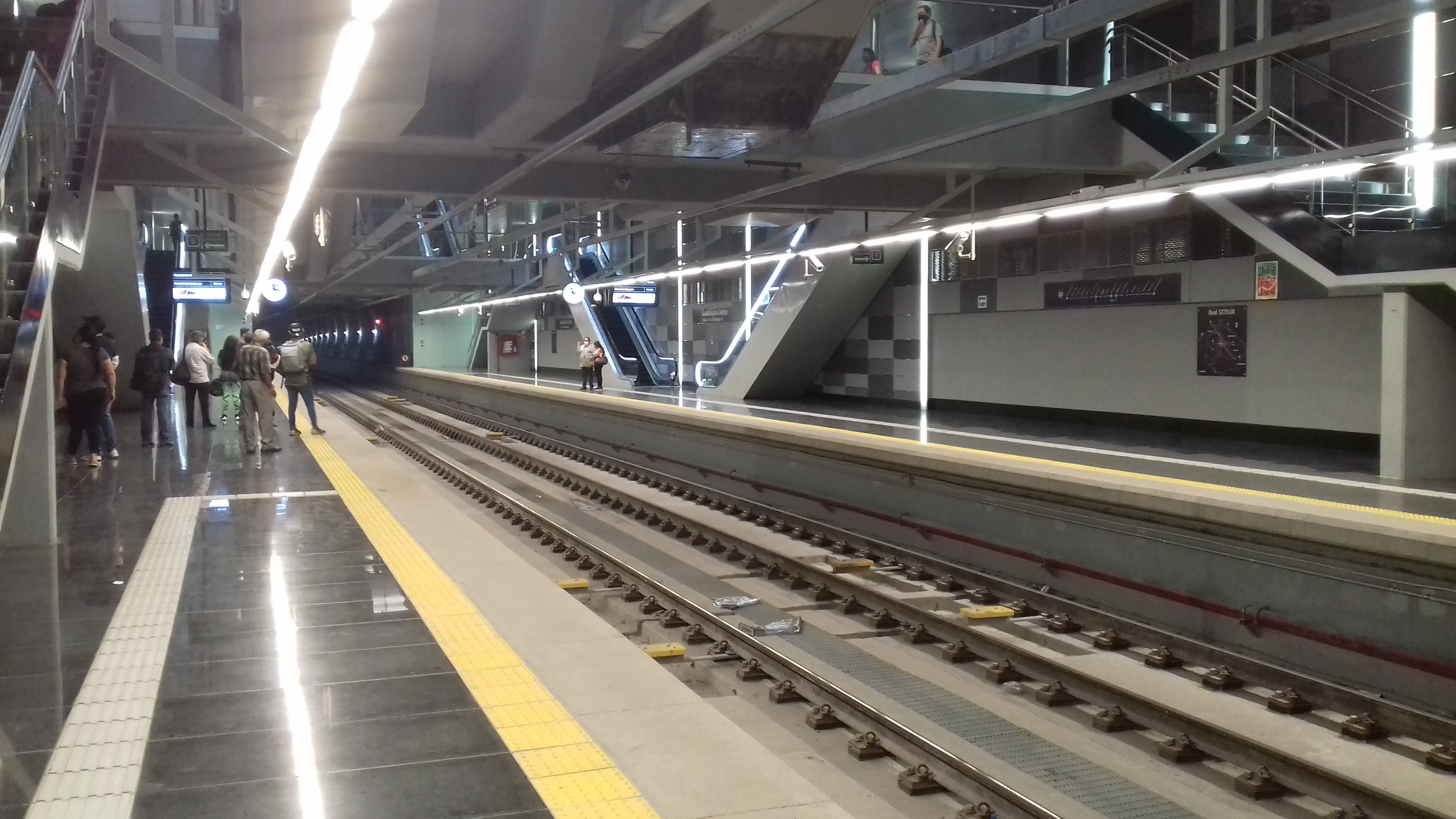
- Line 3 platforms

General information
- Location: Guadalajara; Jalisco, Mexico
- Coordinates: 20°40′34″N 103°20′51″W
- System: SITEUR light rail
- Lines: 2 and 3
- Tracks: 2

Construction
- Structure type: Underground
- Cycle facilities: Yes
- Accessible: Yes

History
- Opened: September 12, 2020

Services
Preceding station	Sistema de Tren Eléctrico Urbano	Following station
Juárez Terminus	Line 2	San Juan de Dios towards Tetlán
Santuario towards Arcos de Zapopan	Line 3	Independencia towards Central de Autobuses
Location

Guadalajara Centro railway station is the ninth station of Line 3 of Guadalajara's SITEUR from south-east to north-west, and the tenth in the opposite direction; it is also a station with a large influx of passengers because it acts as a transfer station with Plaza Universidad on Line 2 of the system.

This station is located under 16 de Septiembre Avenue, between Eje Morelos (which separates Juárez and Hidalgo Guadalajara sectors) and Juárez Avenue (under which Line 2 runs). During the construction of Line 3 it was necessary to reinforce the structural box that includes the Line 2 tunnel that runs above the structural tunnel corresponding to Line 3; for this, sections called Milan Walls were built.

The station logo is the image of the Metropolitan Cathedral with three colors: the first is pink due to the color of Line 3, the second color is green for the transfer to Line 2 and the last color is red for the transfer to SITREN Lines 1 and 3.

== Gallery ==
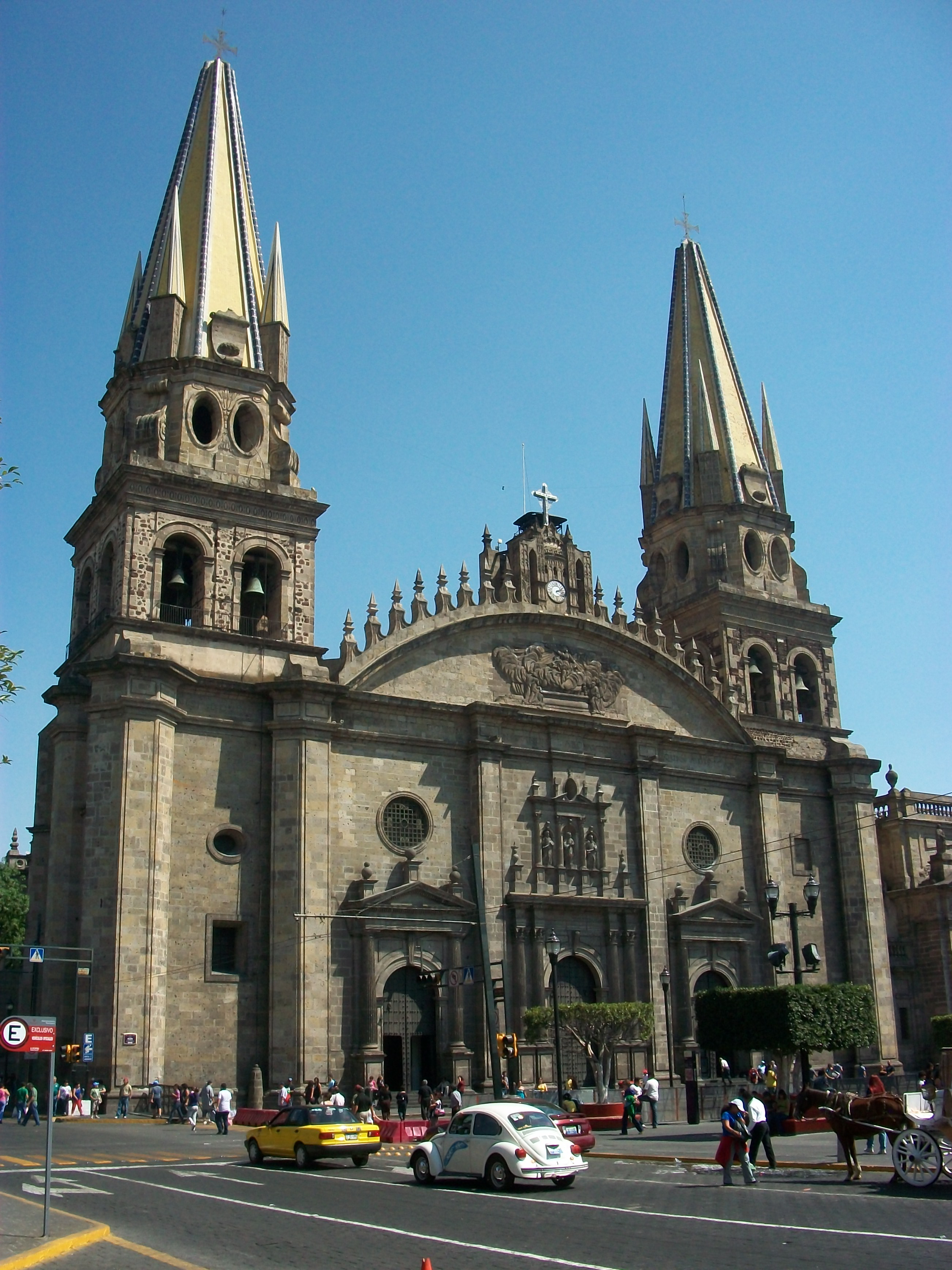
Guadalajara Cathedral, located over the Guadalajara Centro station

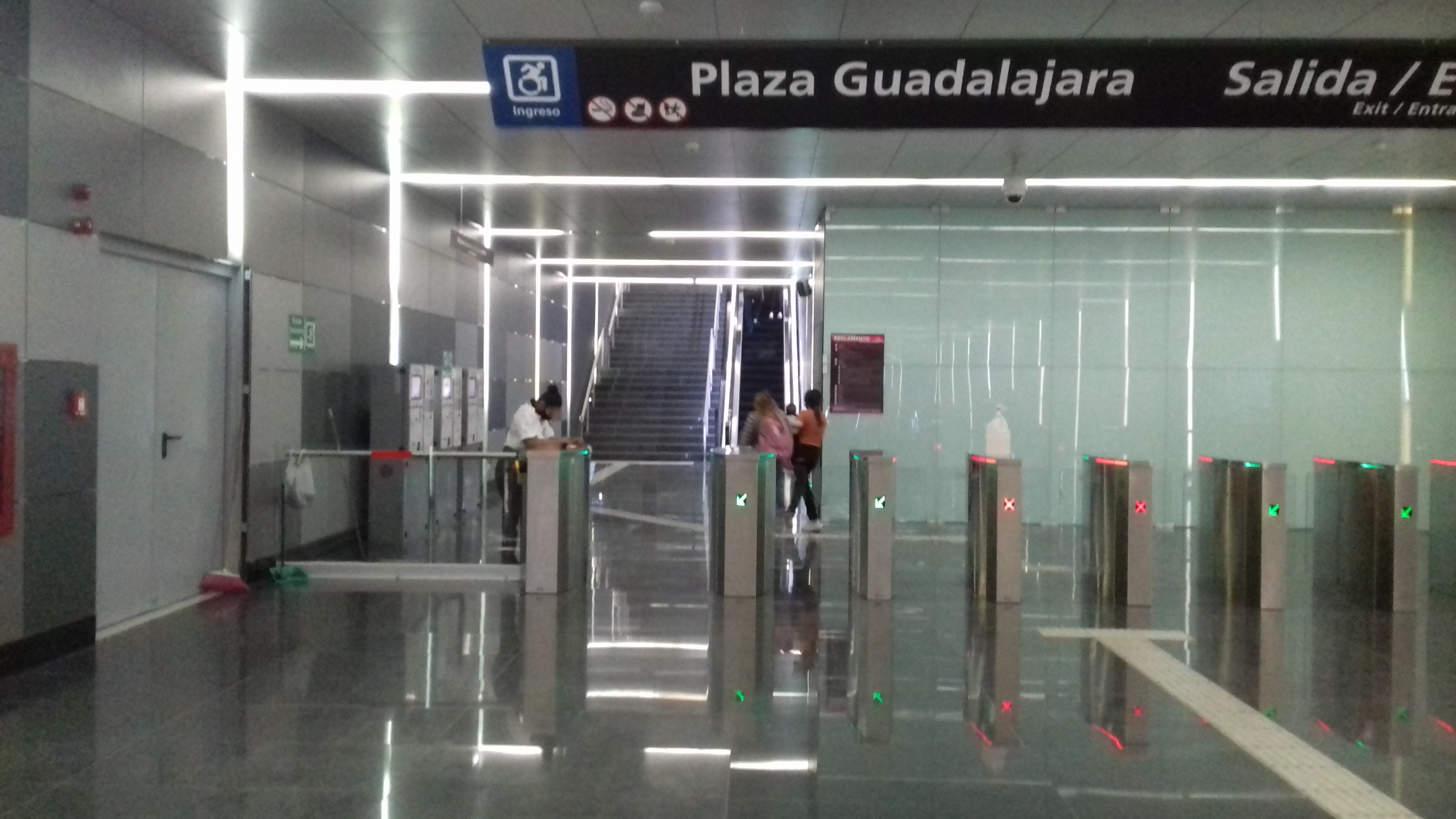
Exit to Plaza Guadalajara

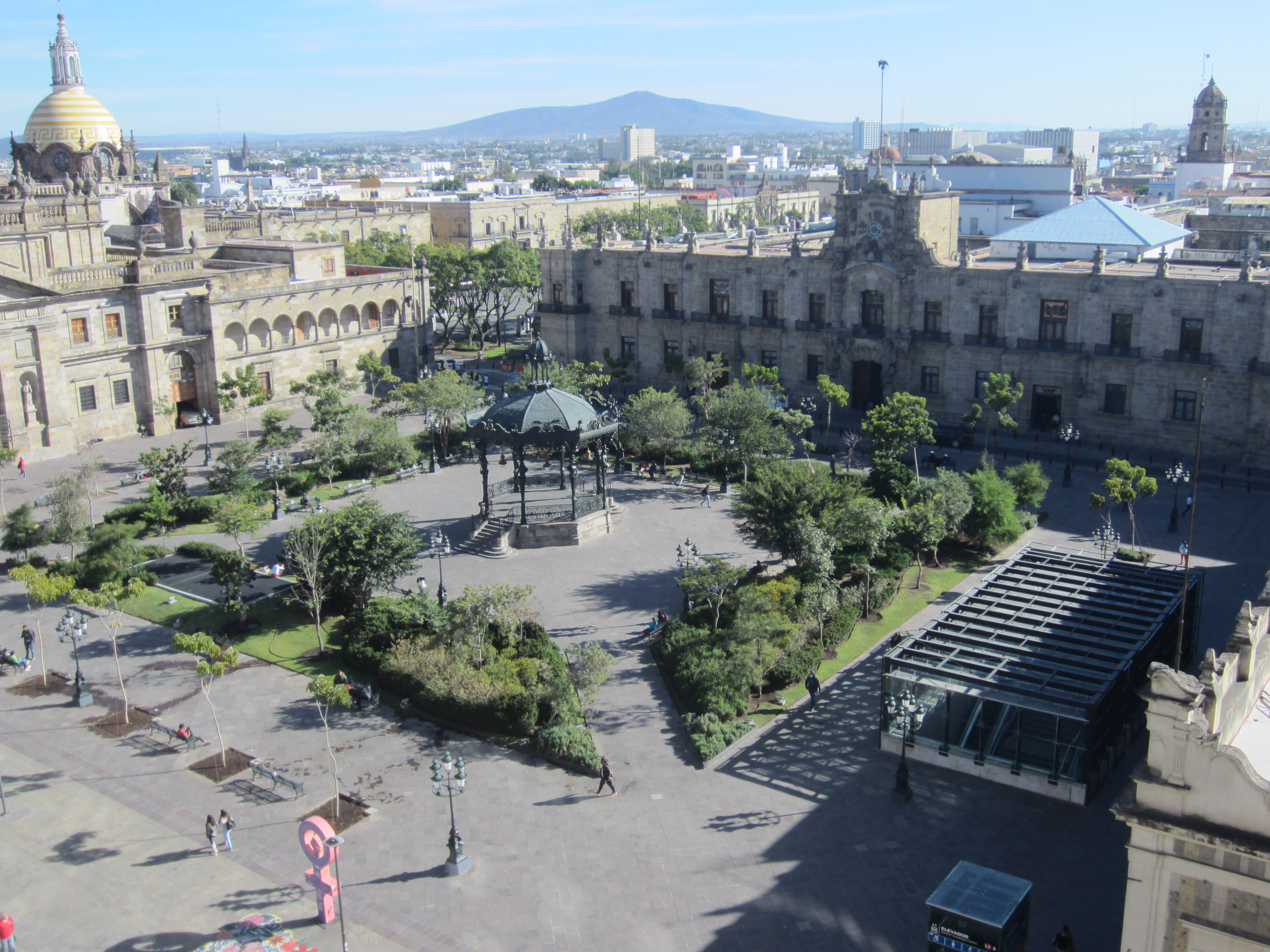
Entrance location (far right) at the Plaza de Armas

Line 3 train arriving at Guadalajara Centro station

== Points of interest ==
- Metropolitan Cathedral
- Former Cloister of San Agustín (CUAAD Music Department)
- Former Cloister of Santa María de Gracia (CUAAD Plastic Arts School)
- Government Palace
- Municipal Palace
- Legislative Palace (Congress of Jalisco)
- Regional Museum
- Teatro Degollado
- Rotonda de los Jaliscienses Ilustres
- Octavio Paz Ibero-American Public Library
- Plaza de La Liberación
- Plaza Guadalajara
- Plaza de Armas
- Mercado Corona
- Edificio Camarena
- Museo de Cera (Wax Museum)
