= Templo de Jesús María =

Church in Guadalajara, Jalisco, Mexico

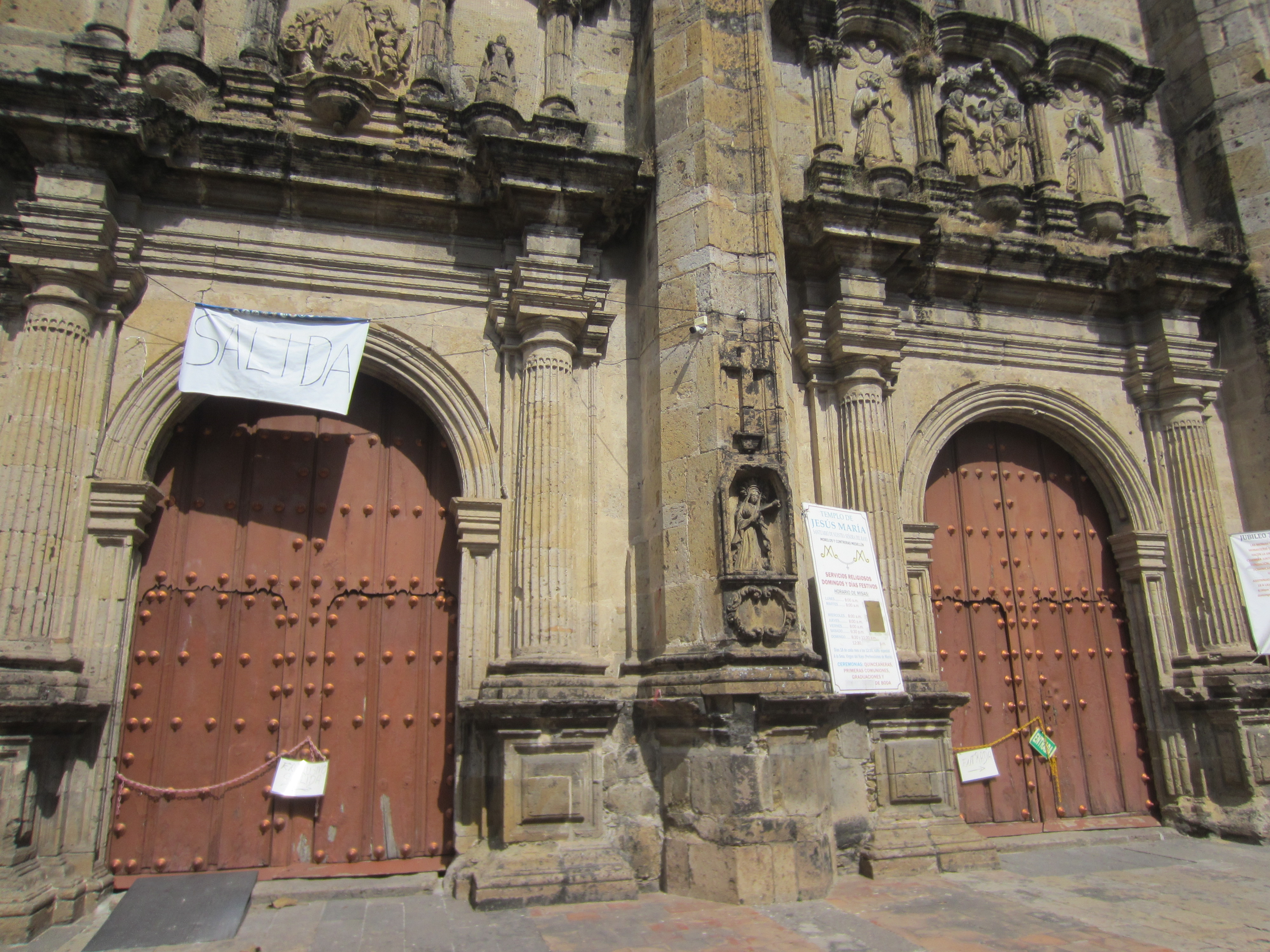
- The church's exterior in 2021

- Location within Mexico

Location
- Location: Guadalajara, Jalisco, Mexico
- Interactive map of Templo de Jesús María
- Coordinates: 20.6766°N 103.3517°W

Templo de Jesús María is a church in Centro, Guadalajara, in the Mexican state of Jalisco.

== History ==
The convent had its origins in the Beaterio de Jesús Nazareno of Compostela, the former capital of Nueva Galicia, which dated back to 1685. The priest Fernando de Amezquita had custody of the beatas of the beaterio. Before his death, he wrote a will placing the beaterio under the care of the women themselves. However, his brother, Captain Antonio de Amezquita, tried to inherit the beaterio, which led to a dispute. The Real Audiencia de Nueva Galicia, with the help of the bishop Juan de Santiago y León Garabito, intervened in favor of the beatas, who decided to relocate to the valle de Atemajac in 1692. This was part of a broader process by which all New Spanish institutions moved from Compostela to Guadalajara, solidifying the latter as the kingdom's capital.

Around the same time, the Jesuit Feliciano Pimentel from San Luis Potosí gathered a group of women from Valladolid and settled in Guadalajara. They founded the Colegio de Niñas Jesús María, but Pimentel's superiors prohibited him from continuing the project since he was rector of the Colegio de Santo Tomás. Bishop Felipe Galindo Chávez y Pineda took on the project and tried to merge it with the already existing Beaterio de Jesús Nazareno. By 1707, it was only a matter of choosing between one of the two Dominican beaterios in the city to convert into a convent, according to then-bishop Diego Camacho y Ávila. The beatas of Jesús Nazareno, who possessed coffers totaling over 46,000 pesos, were chosen to establish a new convent. A royal decree in 1721 approved the founding of a new convent with nuns coming from the convent of Santa María de Gracia. The new Dominican convent was named Jesús María and was formally established on 30 May 1721.

The building is known for being one of the stops in the traditional "visita a los siete templos" (visit to the seven churches) that takes place annually during Semana Santa, and which in the case of Guadalajara includes other churches such as the cathedral, the Templo de la Merced, the Basílica de San Felipe Neri, the Templo de Santa Mónica, the Templo de las Capuchinas, and the Templo de Santa Teresa de Jesús.

== Architecture ==
Like typical female convents of its time, its façade runs parallel to the street. It consists of a single nave, two twin doorways, and an atrium. At the foot of the nave stands a bell tower, along with the upper and lower choirs. The corner of the church features a Baroque column with a sculpture of Saint Cristóbal de Licia. The church includes zoomorphic iconography in the form of gargoyles and Marian iconography on its portals, with dedications to Nuestra Señora de la Luz and Nuestra Señora de los Dolores. Its oculus, sacristy, and the grille of the lower choir are notable architectural elements.
