= Monumento a la Independencia =

Monumento a la Independencia may refer to:

- Angel of Independence, Mexico City, Mexico
- Monumento a la Independencia (Guadalajara), Jalisco, Mexico
