= Statue of José Clemente Orozco (Centro, Guadalajara) =

Statue in Guadalajara, Jalisco, Mexico

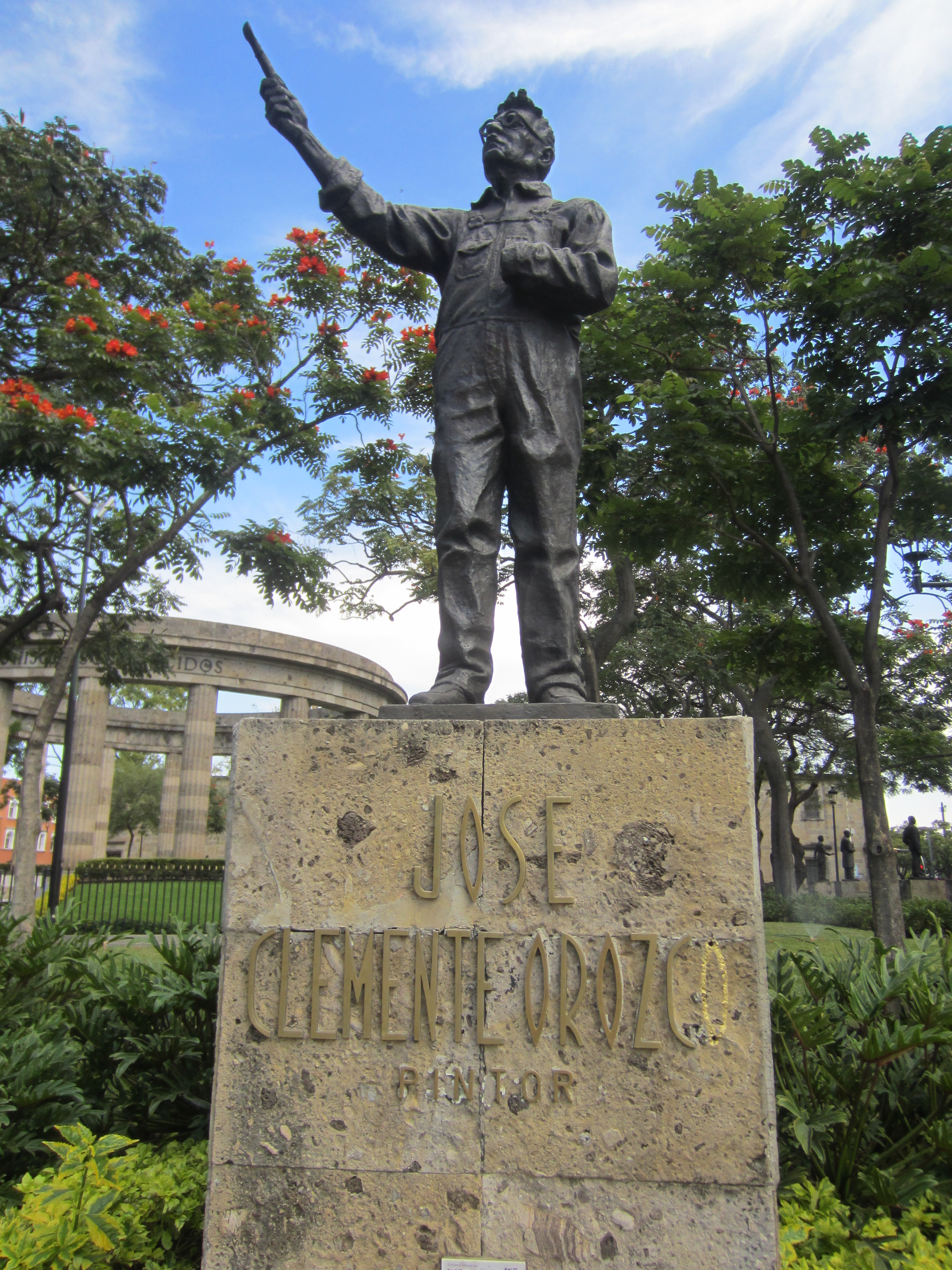
- The statue in 2021
- Subject: José Clemente Orozco
- Location: Guadalajara, Jalisco, Mexico; 20°40′39.3″N 103°20′50.4″W

A statue of José Clemente Orozco is installed in Centro, Guadalajara, in the Mexican state of Jalisco.
