= Las Danzarinas =

Fountain in Guadalajara, Jalisco, Mexico

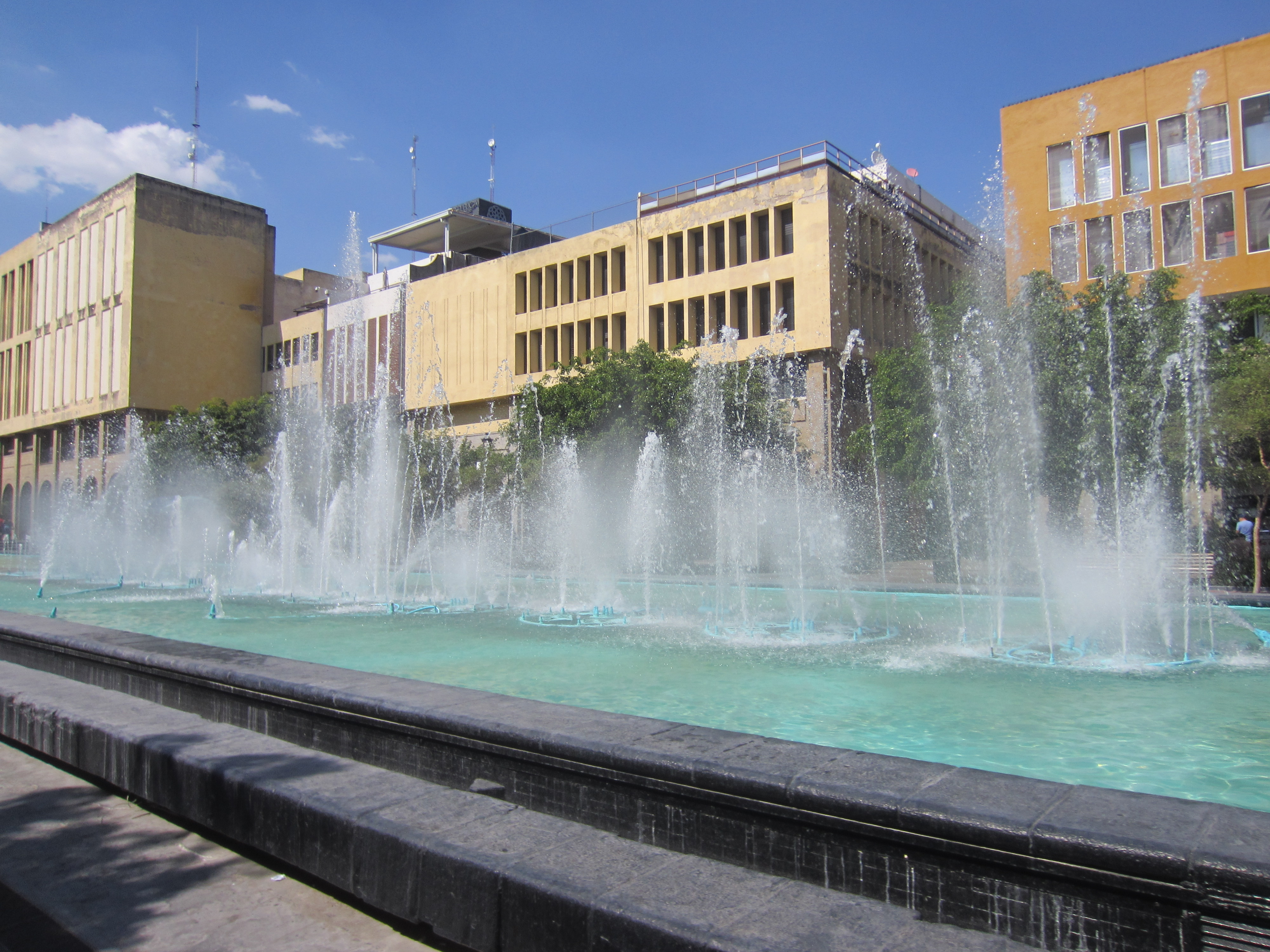
- The fountain in 2021
- Location: Guadalajara, Jalisco, Mexico
- Coordinates: 20.6768°N 103.3395°W

Las Danzarinas are a group of fountains installed between Plaza Tapatía and Hospicio Cabañas in Guadalajara, in the Mexican state of Jalisco. Also known as "Del Espejo" and "Fuente Danzarina" (English: "Dancing Fountain"), then fountain is a replica of one at Taj Mahal.

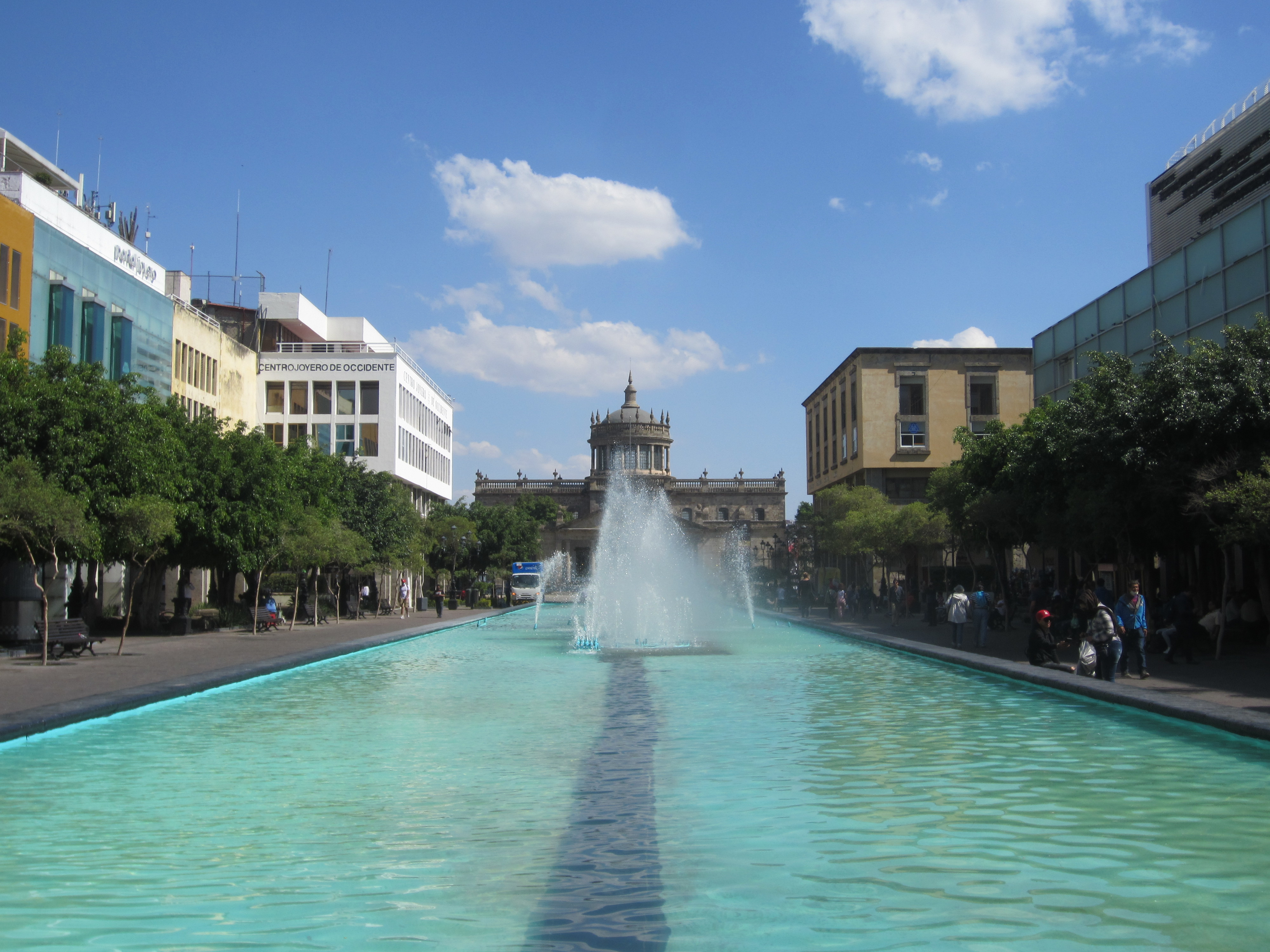

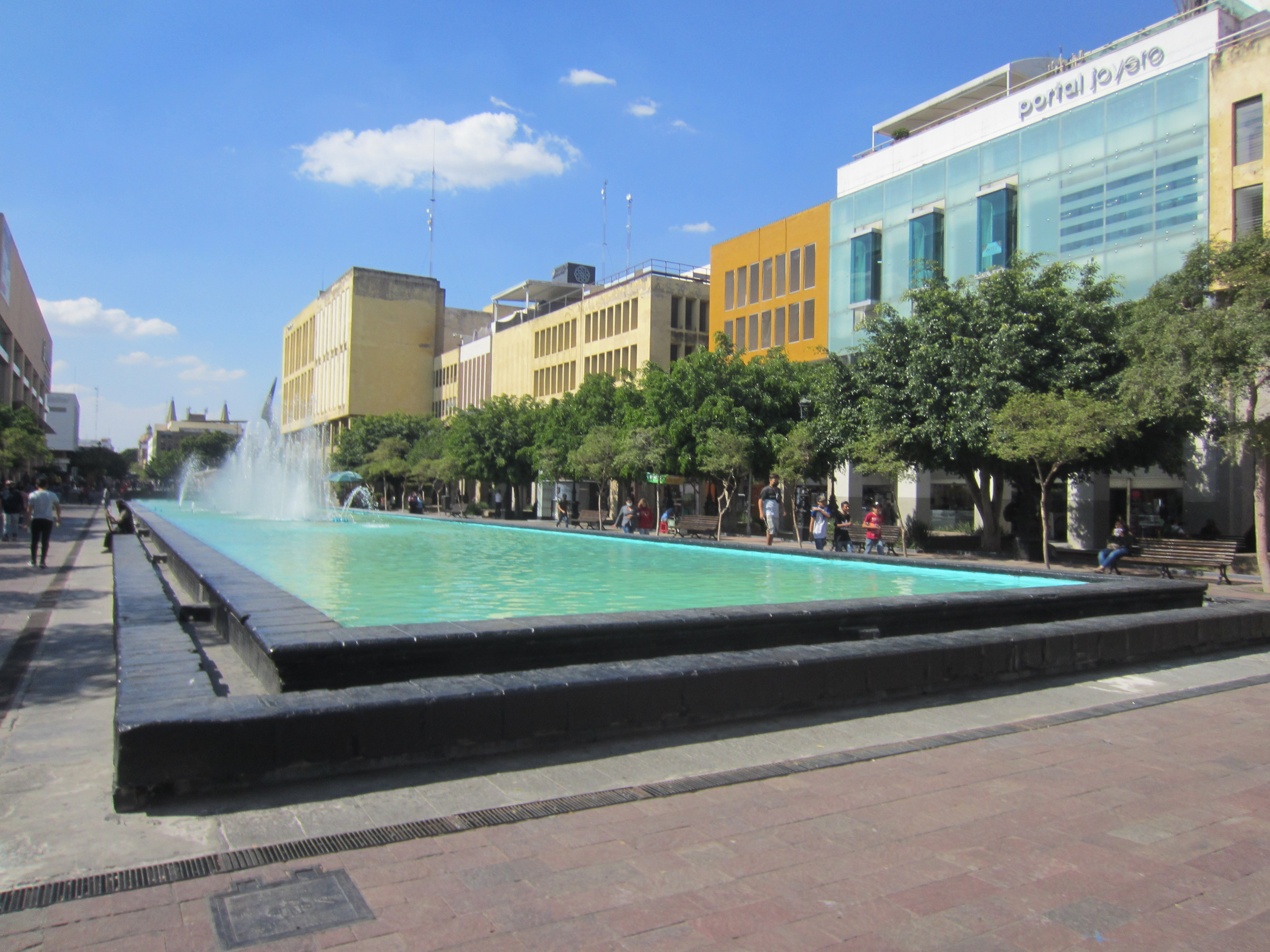
