= Statue of Miguel de Ibarra =

Statue in Guadalajara, Jalisco, Mexico

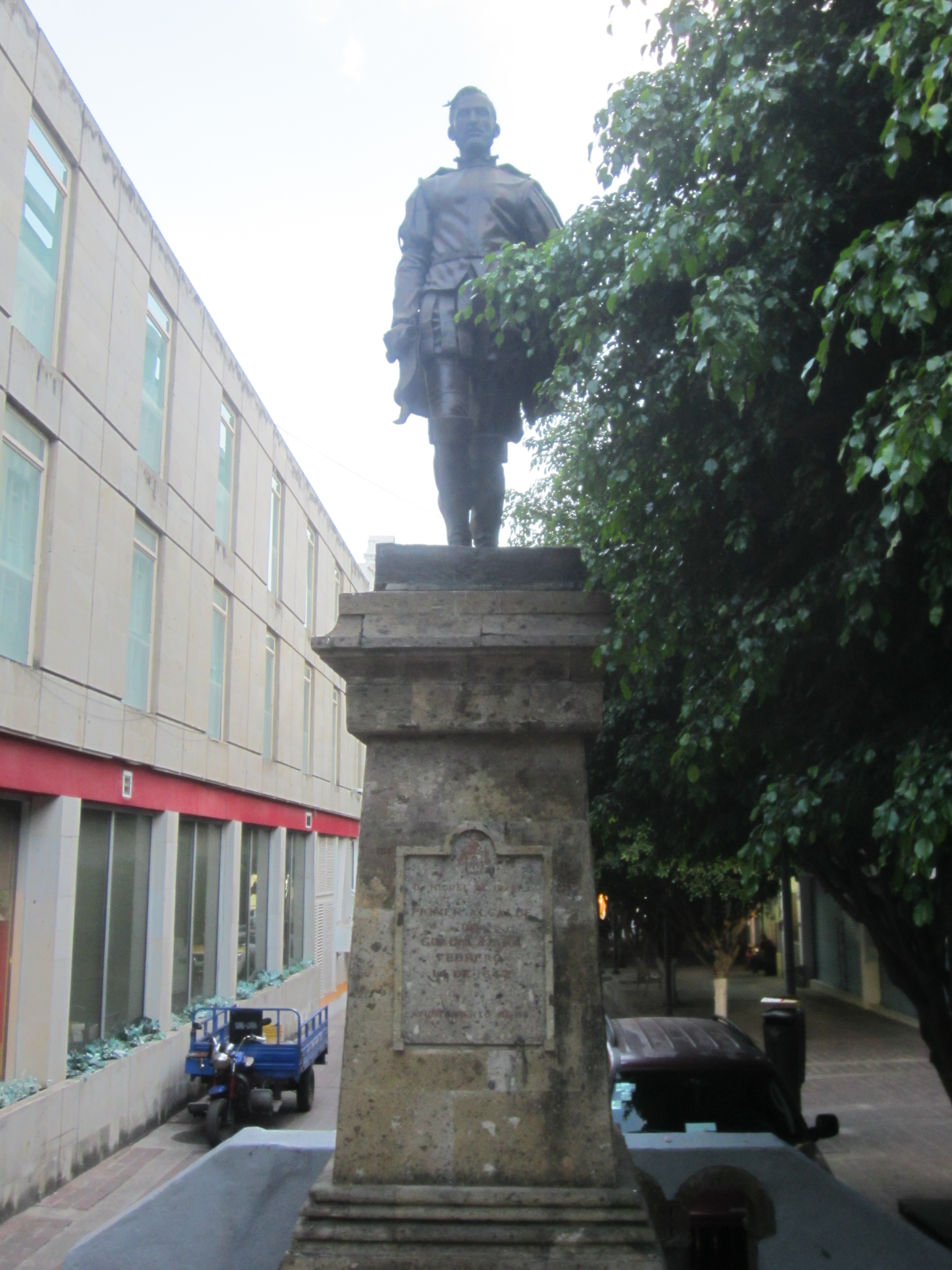
- The statue in 2021
- Subject: Miguel de Ibarra
- Location: Guadalajara, Jalisco, Mexico; 20°40′35.8″N 103°20′37.7″W

A statue of Miguel de Ibarra is installed in Centro, Guadalajara, in the Mexican state of Jalisco.

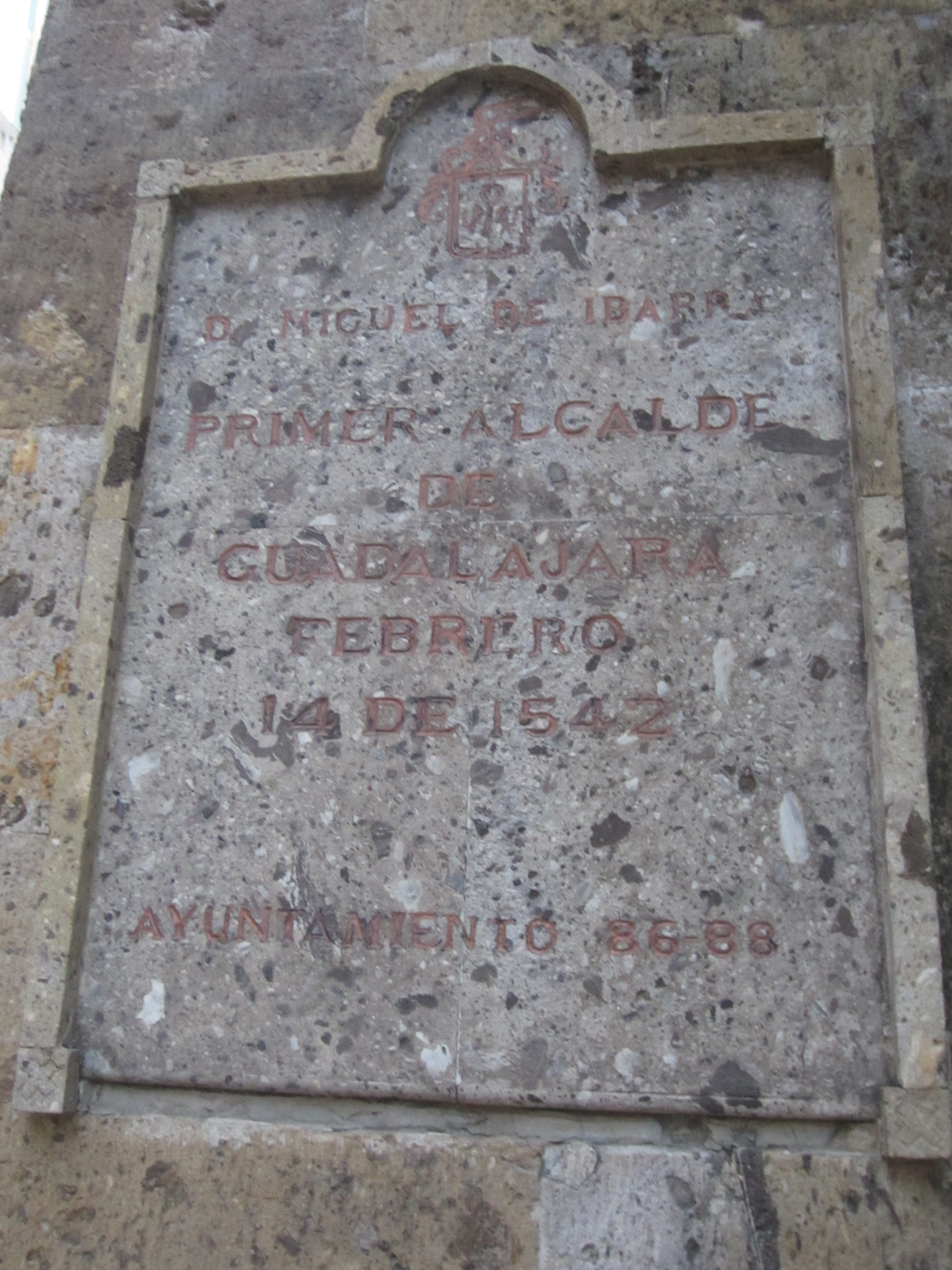

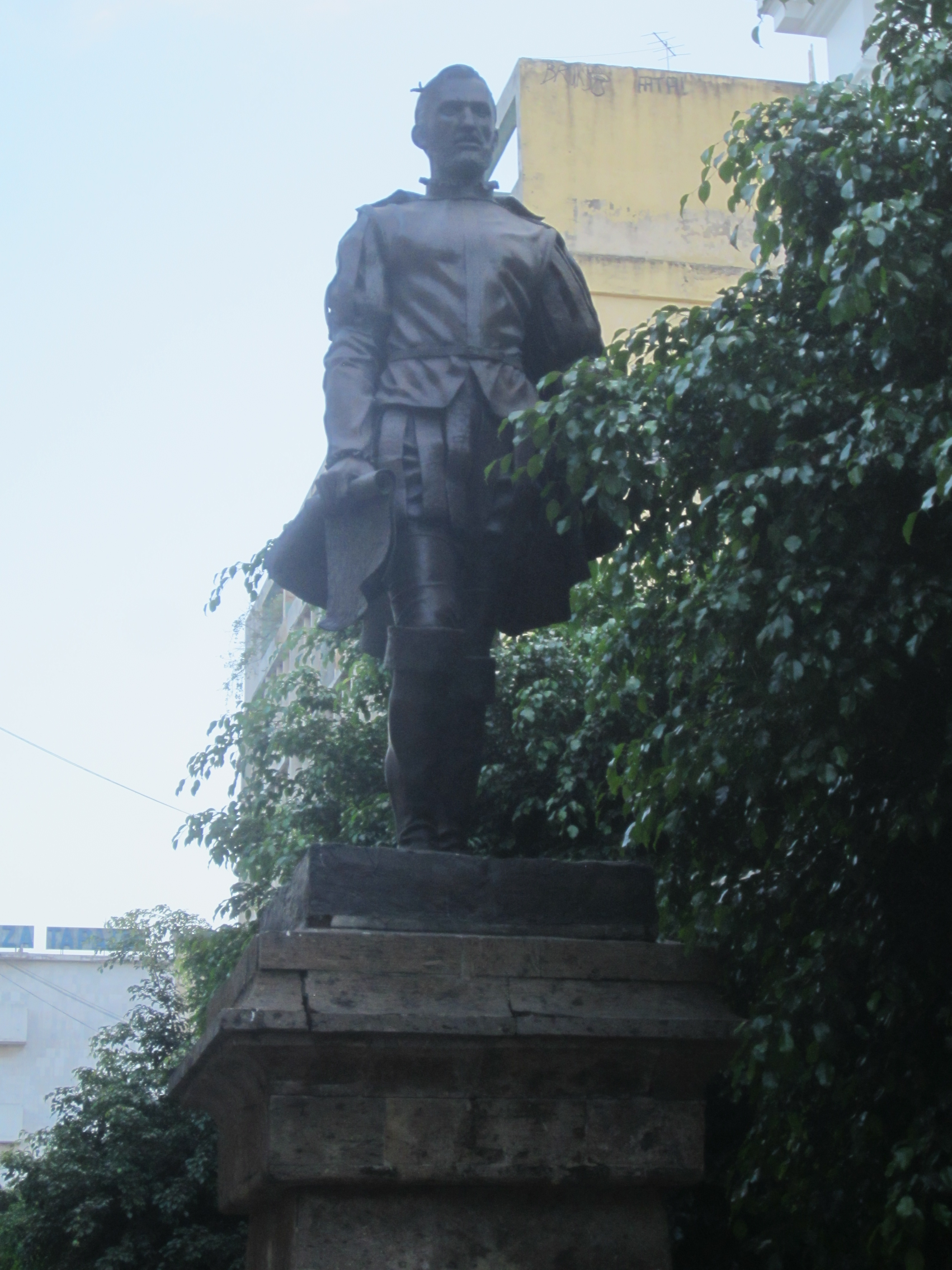
