= Statue of Francisco Tenamaztle =

Statue in Guadalajara, Jalisco, Mexico

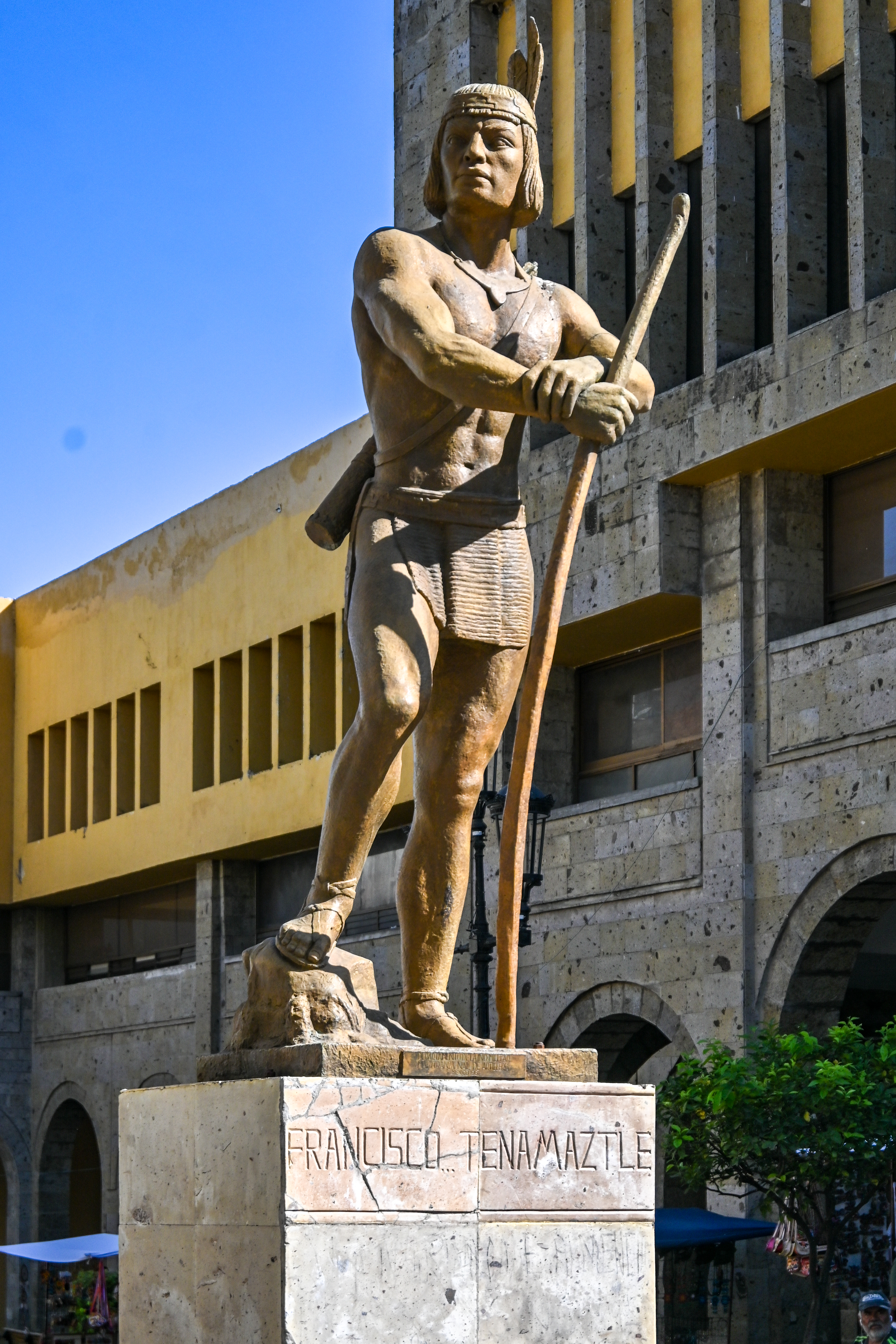
- The statue in 2024
- Subject: Francisco Tenamaztle
- Location: Guadalajara, Jalisco, Mexico; 20°40′37.5″N 103°20′37″W

A statue of Francisco Tenamaztle is installed in Centro, Guadalajara's Plaza Fundadores, in the Mexican state of Jalisco.
