= Templo de Nuestra Señora del Carmen =

Church in Guadalajara, Jalisco, Mexico

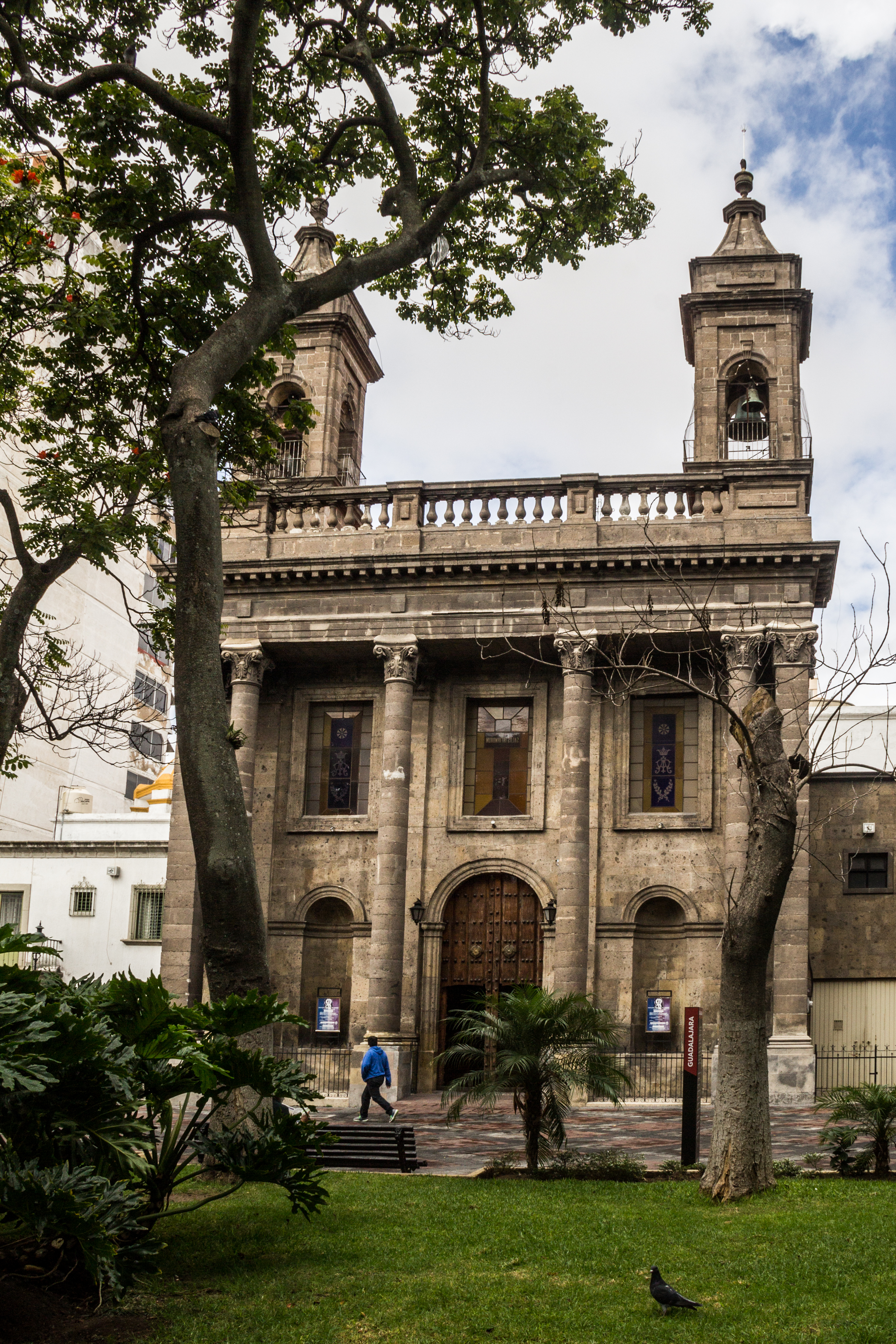

- Location within Mexico

Location
- Municipality: Guadalajara
- State: Jalisco
- Country: Mexico
- Interactive map of Templo de Nuestra Señora del Carmen
- Coordinates: 20.6747°N 103.3533°W

Templo de Nuestra Señora del Carmen is a church in Centro, Guadalajara, in the Mexican state of Jalisco. The building, whose construction began in 1690, is considered an example of neoclassical architecture following a 19th-century renovation that resulted from the widening of the avenue on which it's located.

The church's feast day is celebrated on July 16.
