= Templo de Nuestra Señora de Aranzazú =

Church in Guadalajara, Jalisco, Mexico

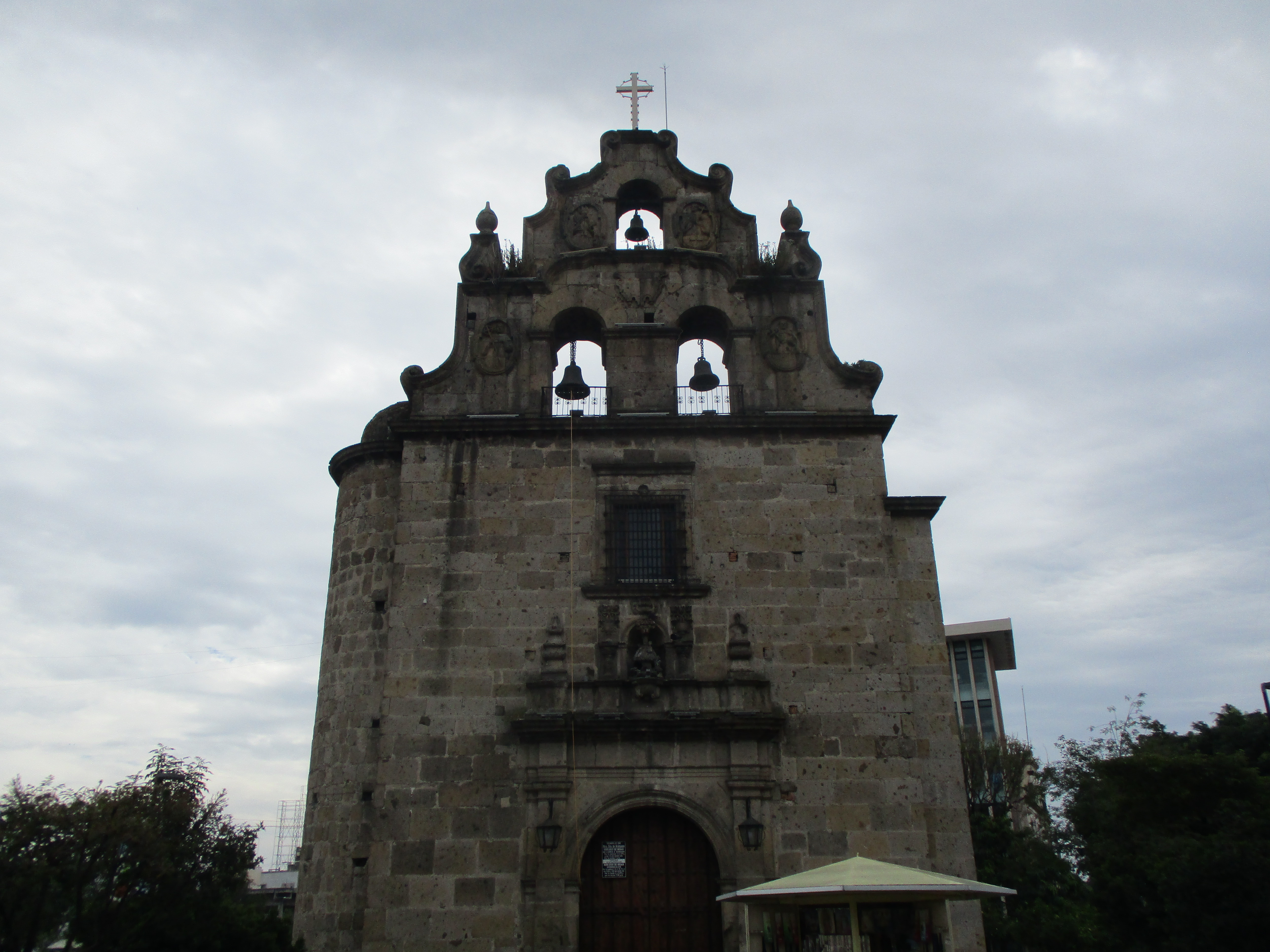
- The church in 2022

- Location within Mexico

Location
- State: Jalisco
- Country: Mexico
- Interactive map of Templo de Nuestra Señora de Aranzazú
- Coordinates: 20.6721°N 103.3476°W

Templo de Nuestra Señora de Aranzazú is a church in Centro, Guadalajara, in the Mexican state of Jalisco.
