= Inmolación de Quetzalcóatl =

Fountain and sculpture in Guadalajara, Jalisco, Mexico

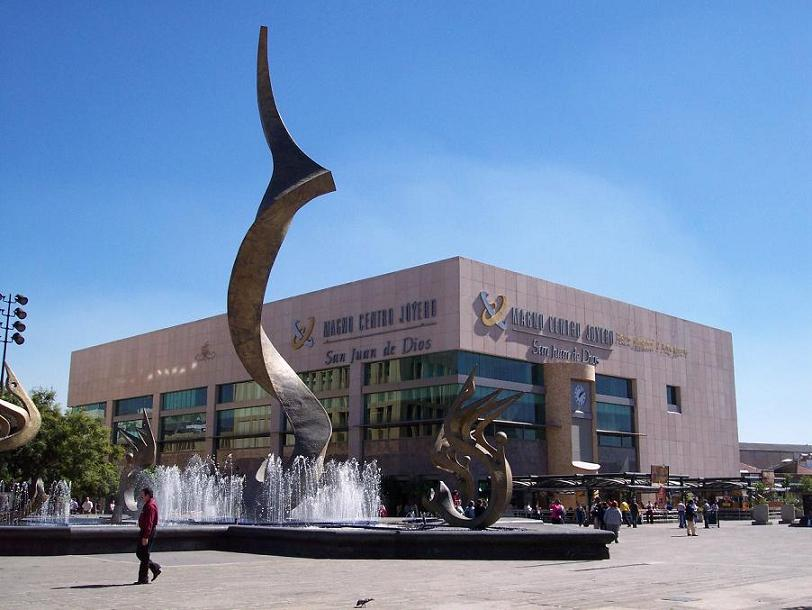
- Artist: Victor Manuel Contreras
- Location: Guadalajara, Jalisco, Mexico
- 20.6769°N 103.3409°W

Inmolación de Quetzalcóatl is a fountain and sculpture by Victor Manuel Contreras, installed in Plaza Tapatía, in Centro, Guadalajara, in the Mexican state of Jalisco.
