= Plaza Fundadores =

Plaza in Guadalajara, Jalisco, Mexico

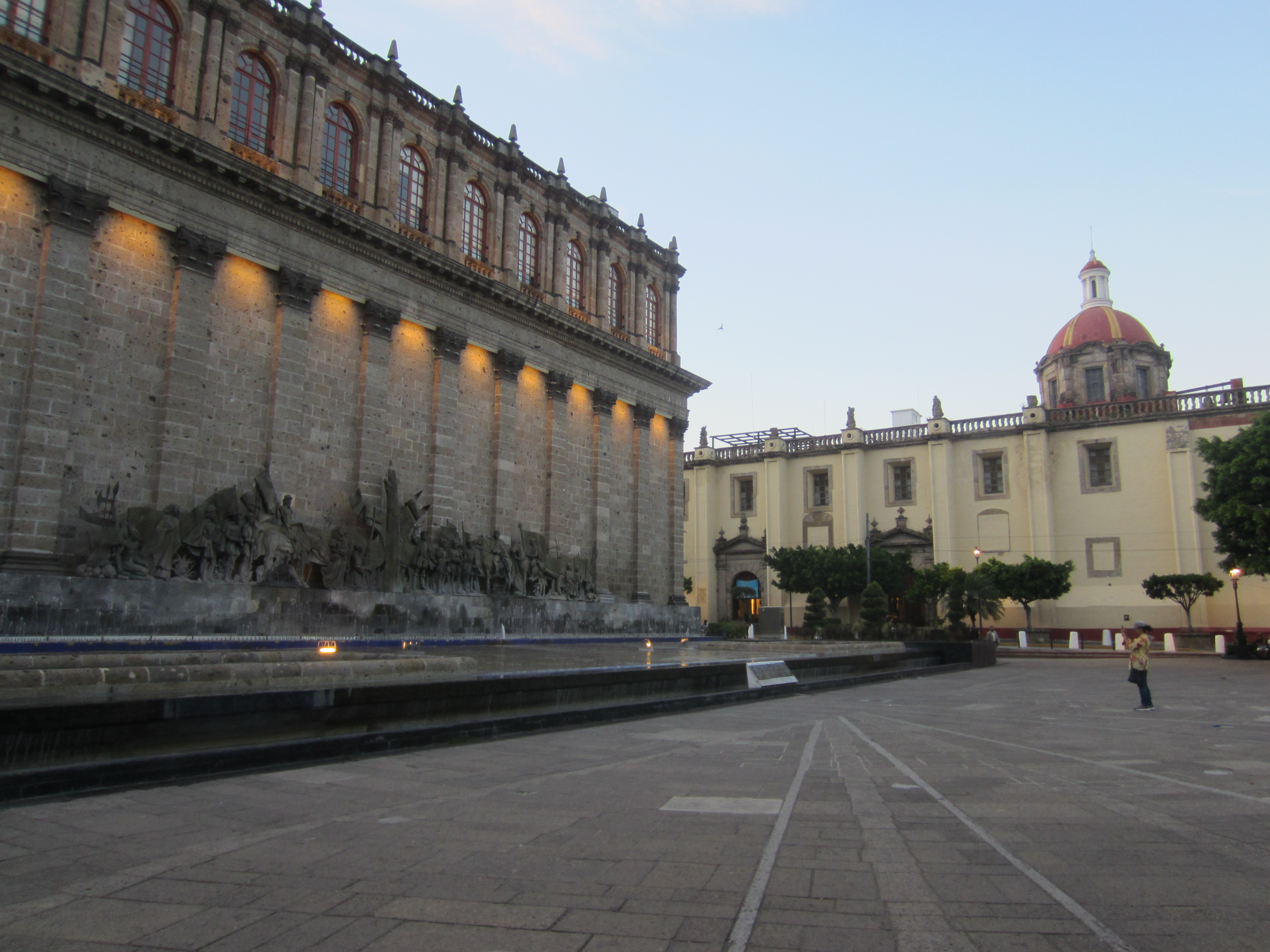
- The plaza in 2021
- Location: Guadalajara, Jalisco, Mexico
- Location within Mexico
- Coordinates: 20.6770°N 103.3438°W

Plaza Fundadores is an urban square in Centro, Guadalajara, in the Mexican state of Jalisco.

Public artworks installed in the plaza include the Friso de los Fundadores de Guadalajara, on the exterior of Teatro Degollado, and statue of Francisco Tenamaztle.
