= Templo de San Agustín =

Church in Guadalajara, Jalisco, Mexico

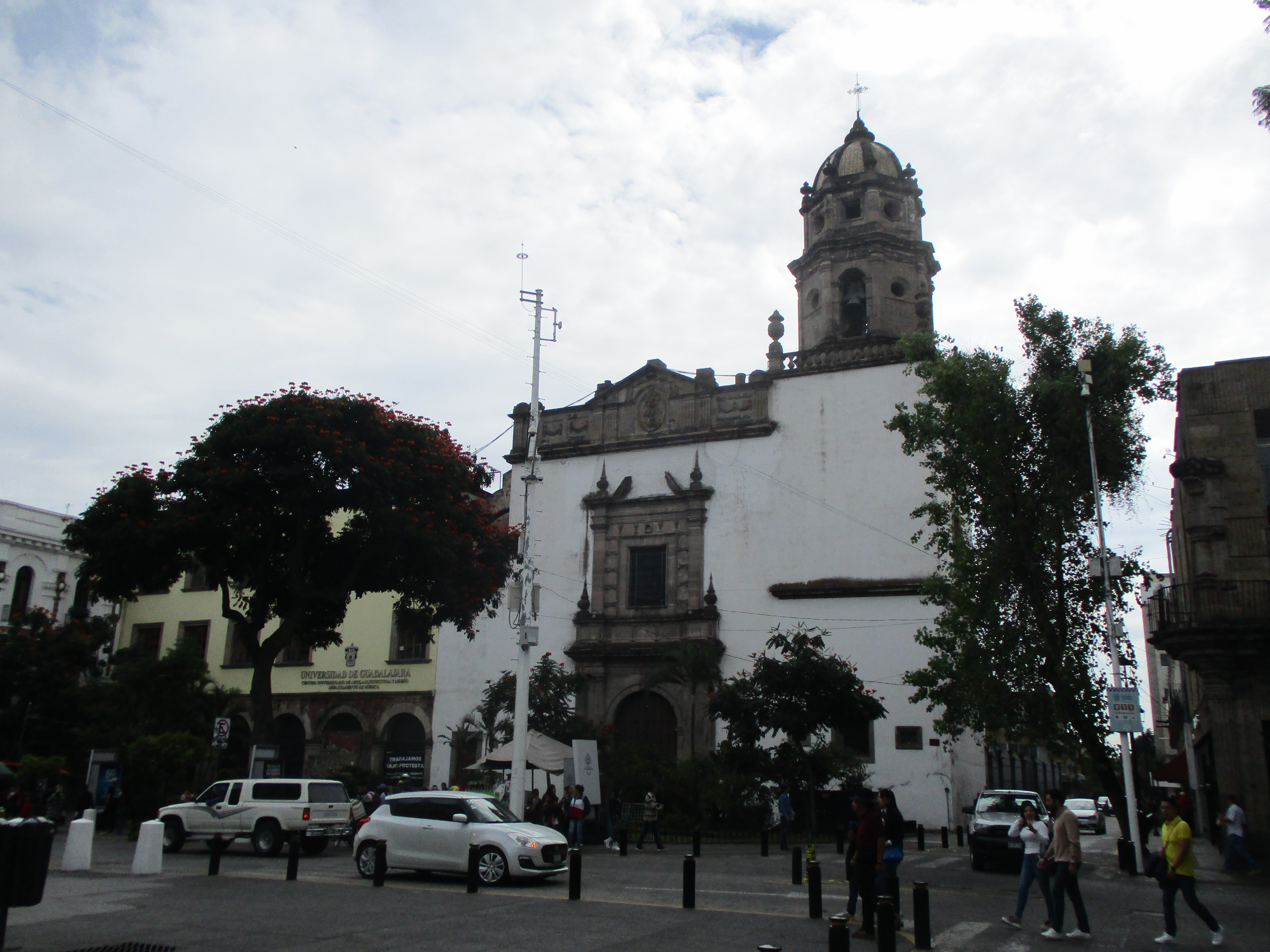
- Templo de San Agustín
- Location: Centro, Guadalajara, Jalisco.
- Country: Mexico

Templo de San Agustín is a church in Centro, Guadalajara, in the Mexican state of Jalisco.
