= Templo de Santa Teresa de Jesús =

Church in Guadalajara, Jalisco, Mexico

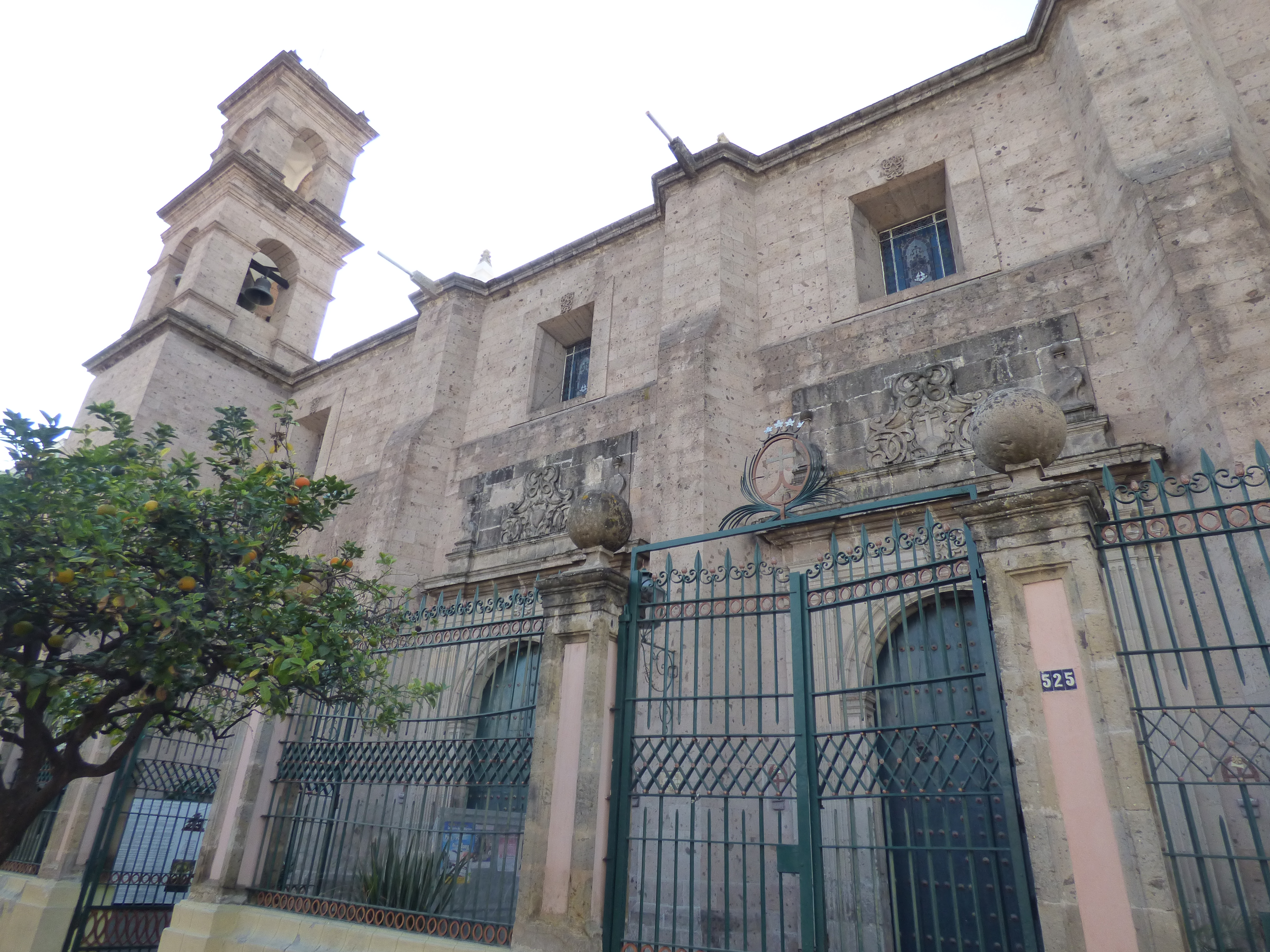
- The church's exterior in 2015

- Location within Mexico

Location
- Location: Guadalajara, Jalisco, Mexico
- Interactive map of Templo de Santa Teresa de Jesús
- Coordinates: 20.6764°N 103.3501°W

Templo de Santa Teresa de Jesús is a church in Centro, Guadalajara, in the Mexican state of Jalisco.
