= Centro, Guadalajara =

Historic center of Guadalajara, Jalisco, Mexico

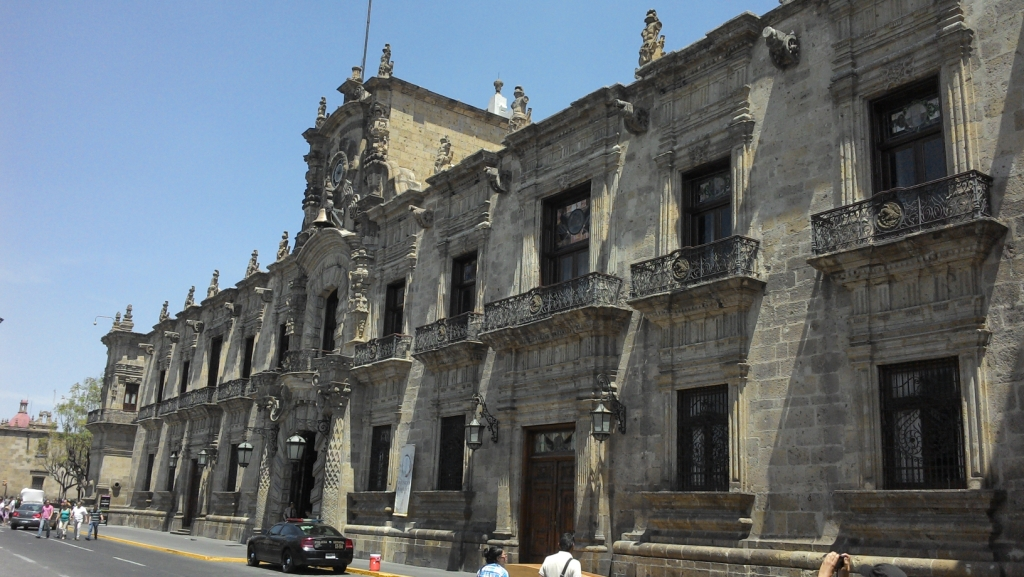
- Palacio de Gobierno de Jalisco
- Interactive map of Centro, Guadalajara
- Country: Mexico
- State: Jalisco

Zona Centro is the historic center of Guadalajara, in the Mexican state of Jalisco.

== Features ==
The area includes many tourist attractions, including Guadalajara Cathedral, the Rotonda de los Jaliscienses Ilustres, and the surrounding plazas: Plaza de Armas, Plaza de la Liberación, Plaza Guadalajara. Inmolación de Quetzalcóatl is installed in Plaza Tapatía. Parque Morelos, Plaza Fundadores, and the Monumento a la Independencia are in Centro.

Notable buildings include the Palacio de Gobierno de Jalisco, Teatro Degollado, Templo de Nuestra Señora de Aranzazú, Templo de Nuestra Señora del Carmen, Templo de Jesús María, Templo de San Agustín, Templo de Santa María de Gracia, and Templo de Santa Teresa de Jesús.
