= Plaza Tapatía =

Plaza in Guadalajara, Jalisco, Mexico

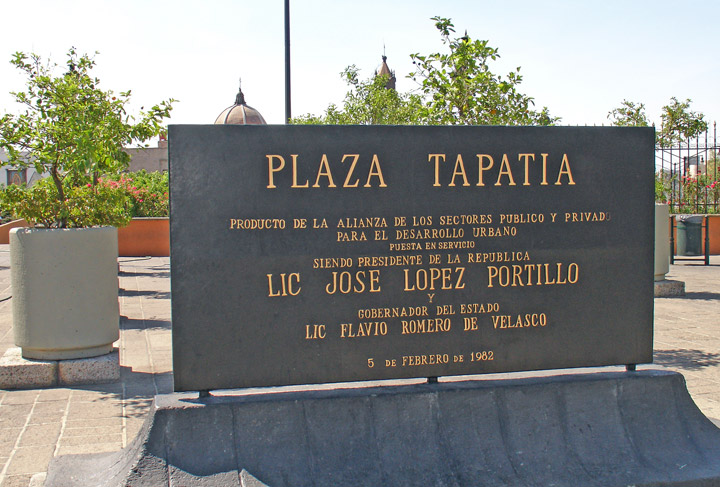
- Plaza signage, 2010
- Location: Guadalajara, Jalisco, Mexico
- Location within Mexico
- Coordinates: 20.6770°N 103.3409°W

Plaza Tapatía is an urban plaza in Centro, Guadalajara, in the Mexican state of Jalisco. The plaza is made of multiple smaller squares, Paseo del Hospicio and the Central Esplanade.

Inmolación de Quetzalcóatl fountain is installed in the plaza. The sculpture was made by Victor Manuel Contreras. The fountain is surrounded by 4 smaller sculptures representing the cardinal points.

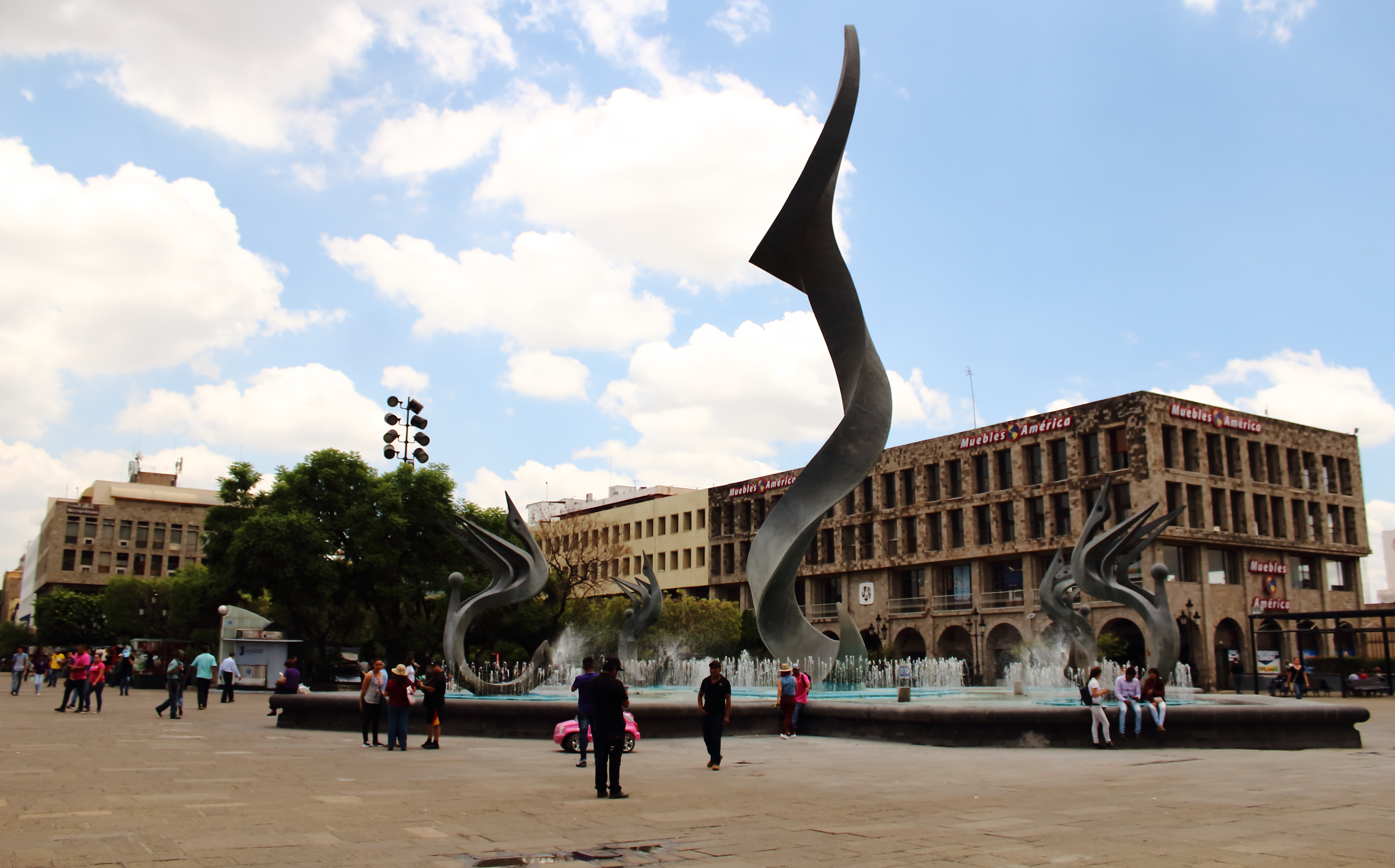
Inmolación de Quetzalcóatl
