= Plaza Guadalajara =

Urban square in Guadalajara, Jalisco, Mexico

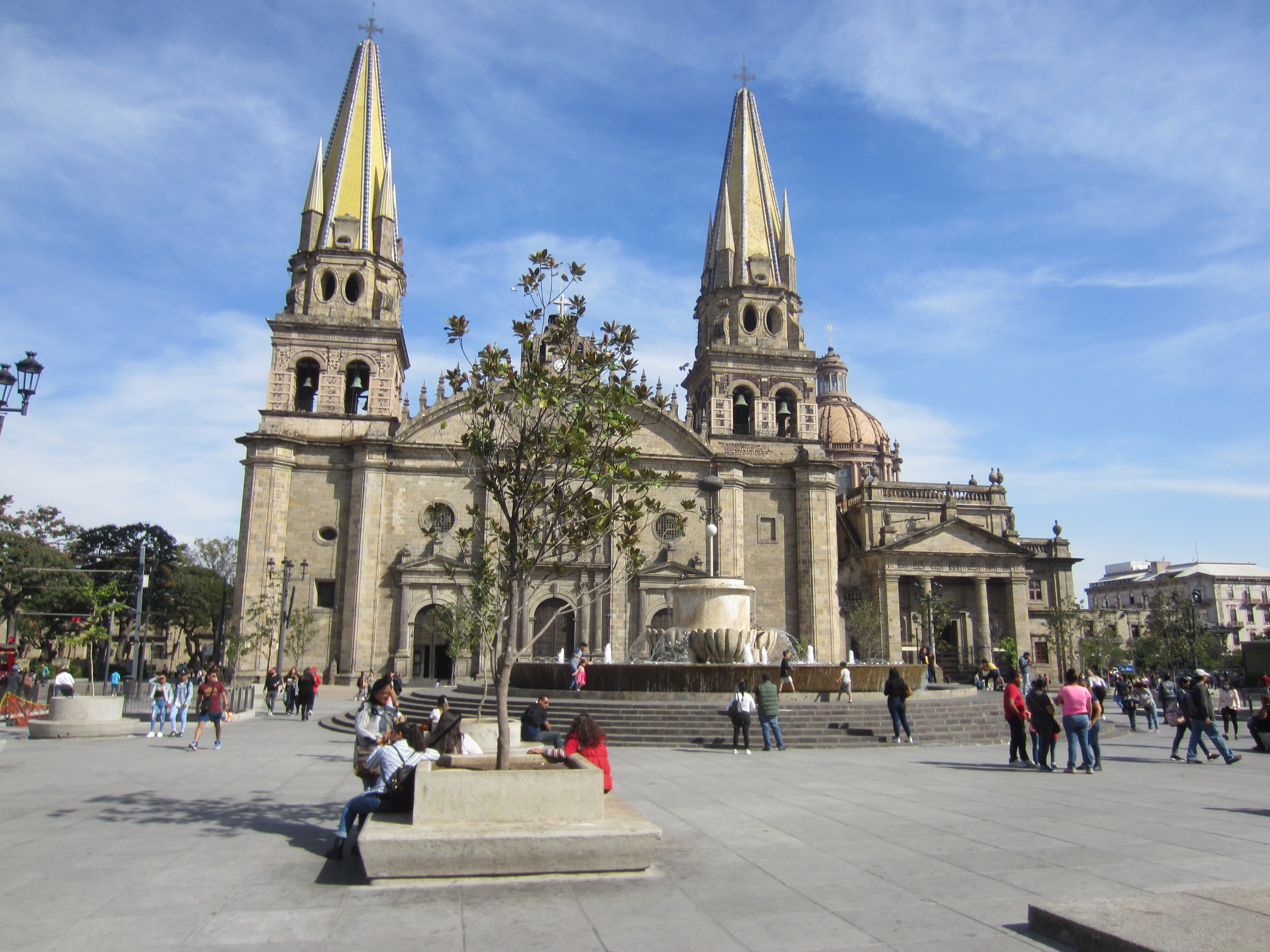
- The plaza in 2021
- Location: Guadalajara, Jalisco, Mexico
- Location within Mexico
- Coordinates: 20.6770°N 103.3478°W

Plaza Guadalajara is an urban square in Centro, Guadalajara, in the Mexican state of Jalisco.
