= Plaza de la Liberación =

Urban square in Guadalajara, Jalisco, Mexico

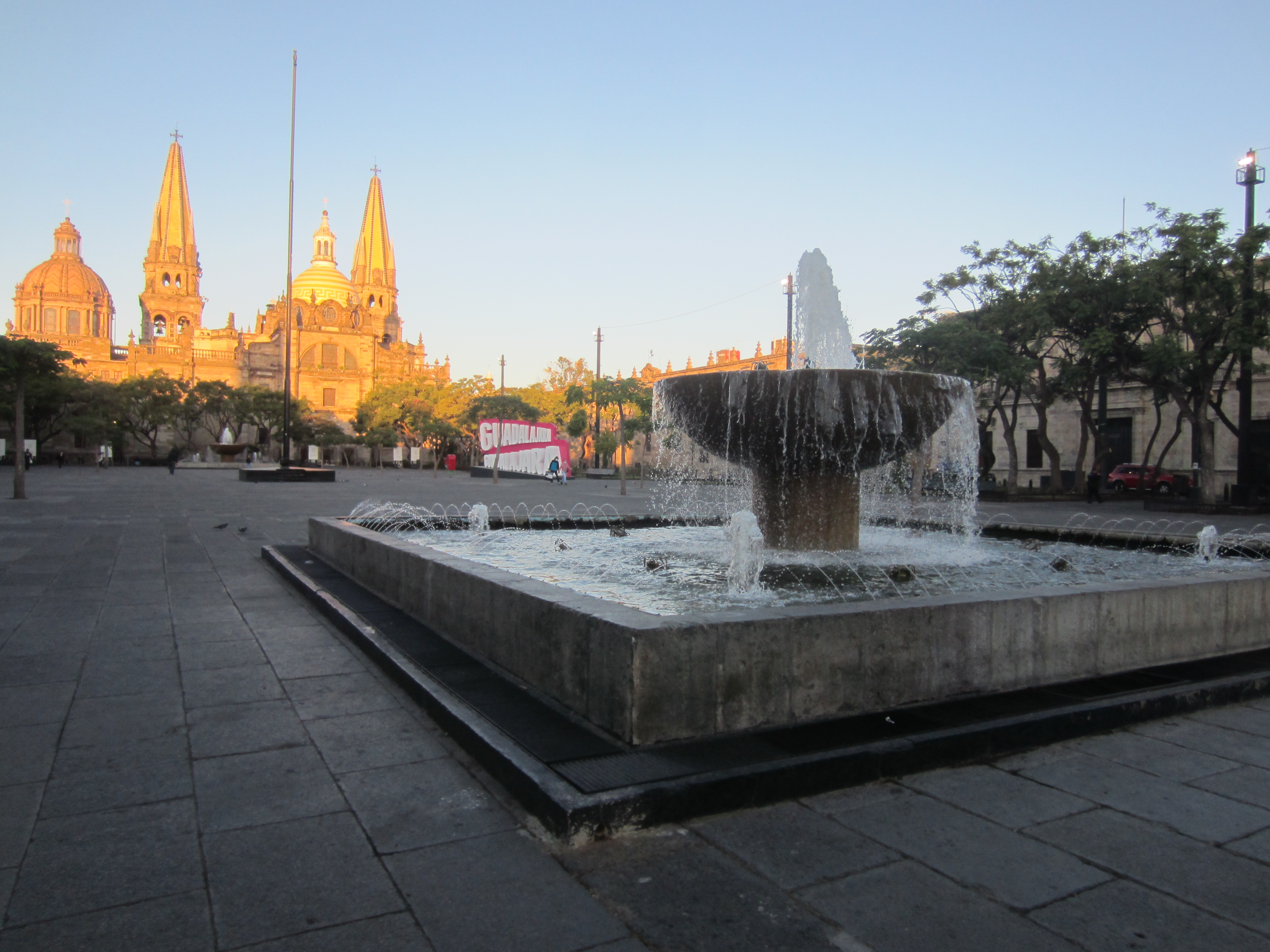
- The plaza in 2021; one of the square's fountains is in the foreground and Guadalajara Cathedral is in the background
- Location: Guadalajara, Jalisco, Mexico
- Location within Mexico
- Coordinates: 20.6770°N 103.3458°W

Plaza de la Liberación is an urban square in Centro, Guadalajara, in the Mexican state of Jalisco.

A statue of Miguel Hidalgo y Costilla is installed in the plaza. The plaza has hosted many events, including the Guadalajara FIFA Fan Festival for the 2026 FIFA World Cup.
