= Templo de Santa María de Gracia =

Church in Guadalajara, Jalisco, Mexico

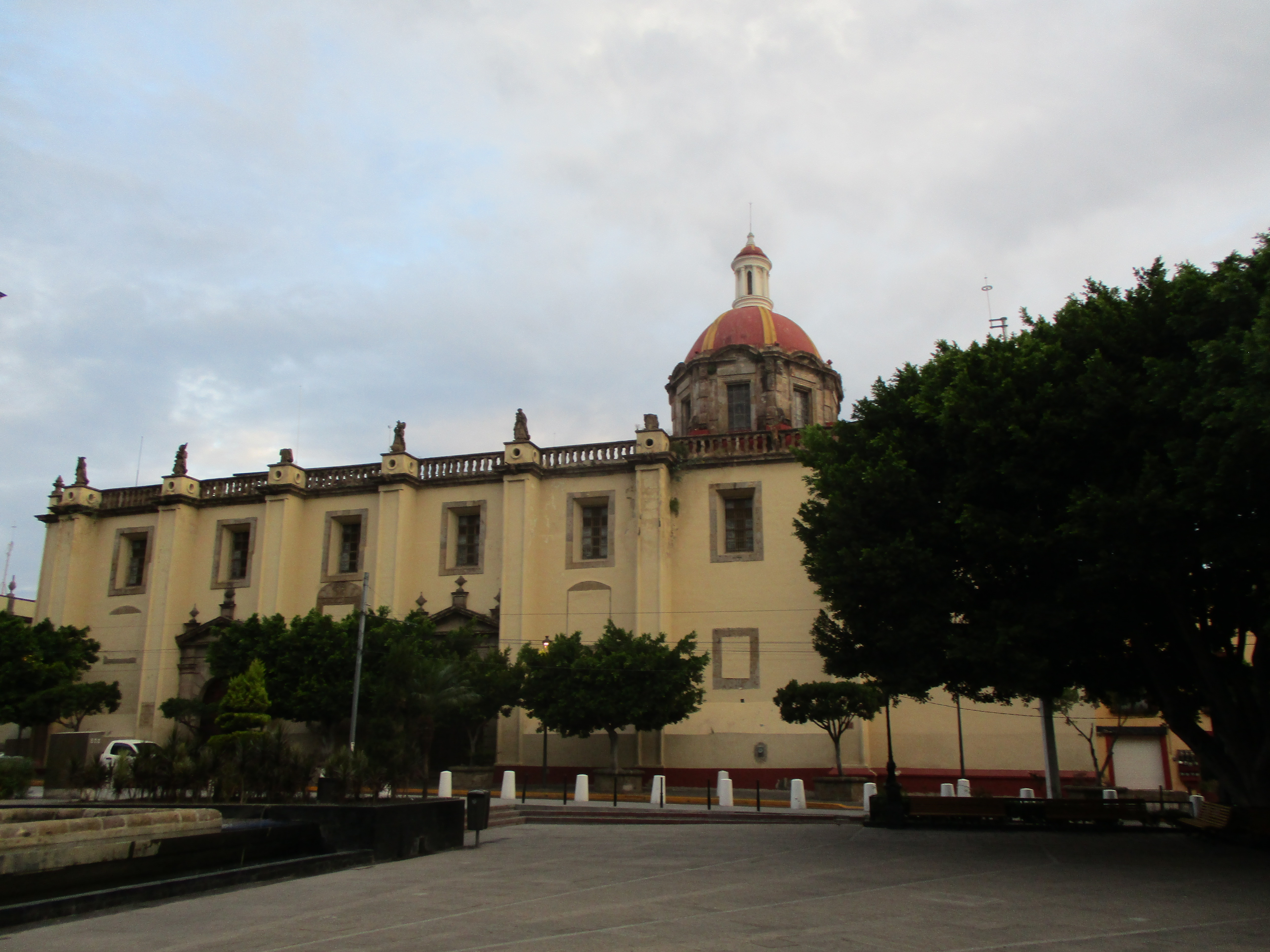
- The church's exterior in 2022

- Location within Mexico

Location
- Location: Guadalajara, Jalisco, Mexico
- Interactive map of Templo de Santa María de Gracia
- Coordinates: 20.6775°N 103.3442°W

Templo de Santa María de Gracia is a church in Centro, Guadalajara, in the Mexican state of Jalisco.
