= Monumento a la Independencia (Guadalajara) =

Monument in Guadalajara, Jalisco, Mexico

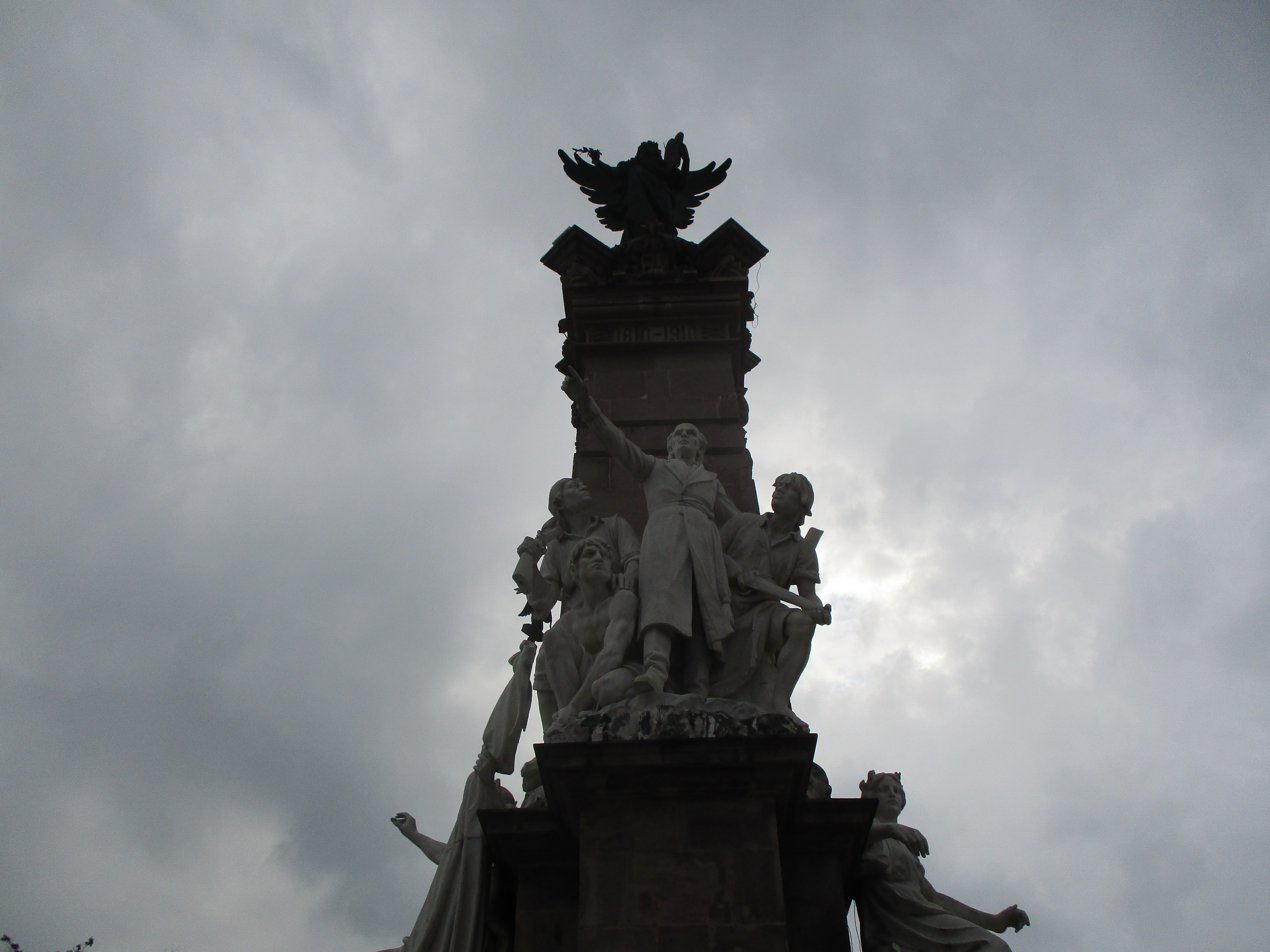
- The monument in 2022
- Location: Guadalajara, Jalisco, Mexico
- Coordinates: 20.67133°N 103.34393°W

The Monumento a la Independencia is a monument located in Guadalajara, in the Mexican state of Jalisco.
