= Teatro Degollado =

Theater in Guadalajara, Jalisco, Mexico

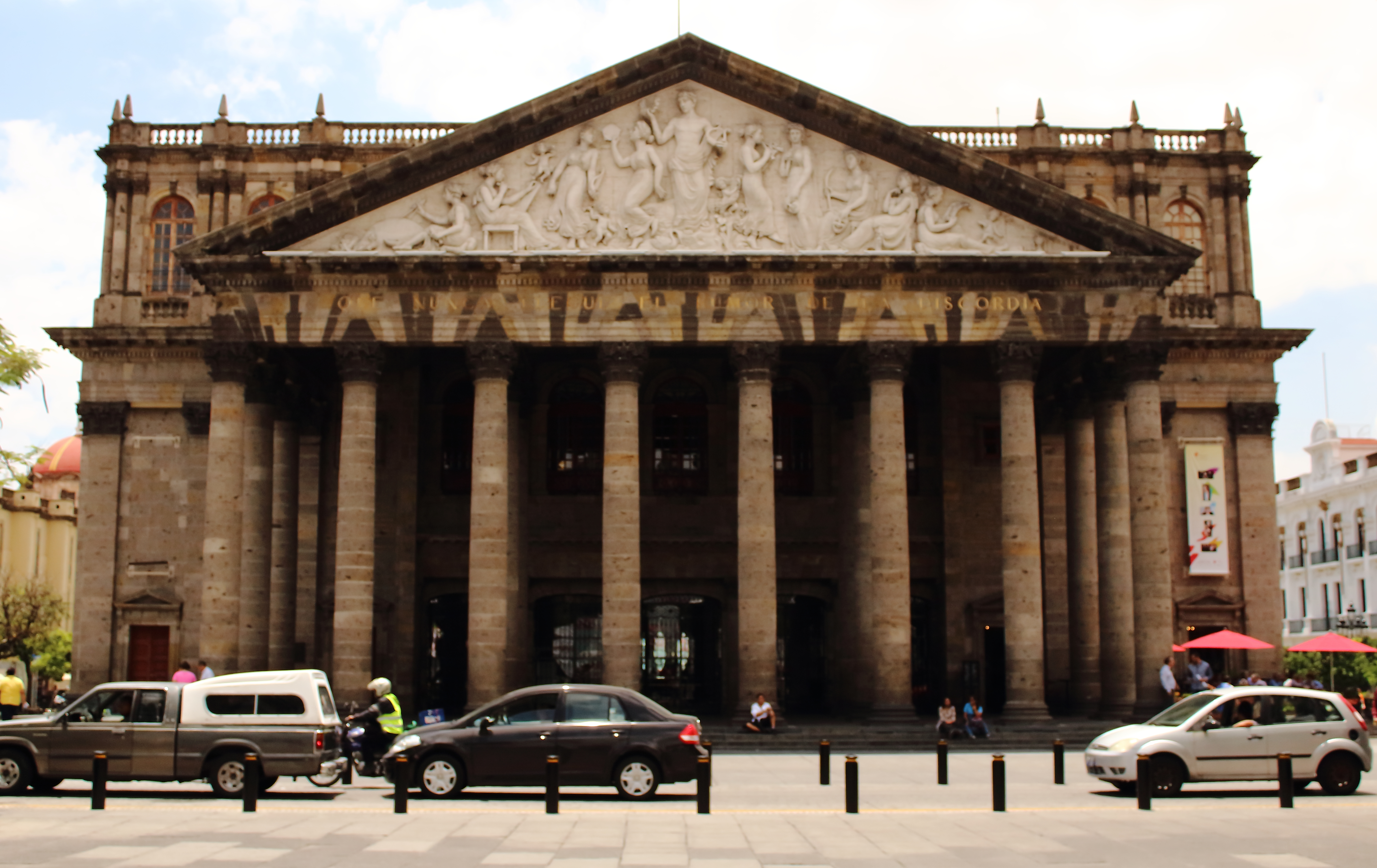

General information
- Architectural style: Neoclassical
- Location: Guadalajara, Mexico

Teatro Degollado (Spanish: [teˈatɾo ðeɣoˈʝaðo], Degollado Theater) is a neoclassical Mexican theater known for its diverse performances and artistic design. It is located in the central plaza of Guadalajara, Jalisco, Mexico on Belen Street between Hidalgo Avenue and Morelos Avenue. Many performances from cultural Mexican dances to international operas take place in this building. Meant to be a monument of Guadalajara's culture, the theater was inaugurated in September 1866 and is a major landmark of the city.

== Original plans ==
Degollado Theater was constructed during Mexico's 1800s theatrical movement. There was a high demand for a great theater in Guadalajara that displayed the cultural arts of the city. In response to the demand, on October 1, 1855, Antonio Pérez Verdía proposed the construction of Alarcón Theater (after the classic dramatist Juan Ruiz de Alarcón) to the current governor of the time, Santos Degollado. On December 12 of that same year, Degollado signed the official decree to build the structure, and in March, 1856, Degollado set the first cornerstone of the building. In April 1856, Jacobo Gálvez was appointed to lead the initial construction of the theater.

Due to the conflicts of Mexican liberals and conservatives in Mexico, and a change of government during the Second Mexican Empire, the completion of the project was slow. On November 12, 1861, Governor Pedro Ogazón changed the proposed name of the project from the Alarcón Theater to the Degollado Theater, after ex-governor and general Santos Degollado (killed in a battle on June 16, 1861). This change of name was not acknowledged at the time of inauguration, but was adopted on December 18, 1866, when Mexican liberal troops regained control of the plaza where the theater is located.

== Inaugurations ==
The theater's first inauguration was on September 13, 1866, with the opera "Lucia di Lammermoor", the title role being performed by Ángela Peralta, opera soprano noted as the "Mexican Nightingale". The theater had not yet been completed. Subsequently, there were many renovations and four more inaugurations: October 30, 1880; September 15, 1910; June 28, 1941; and September 8, 1964.

== Design ==
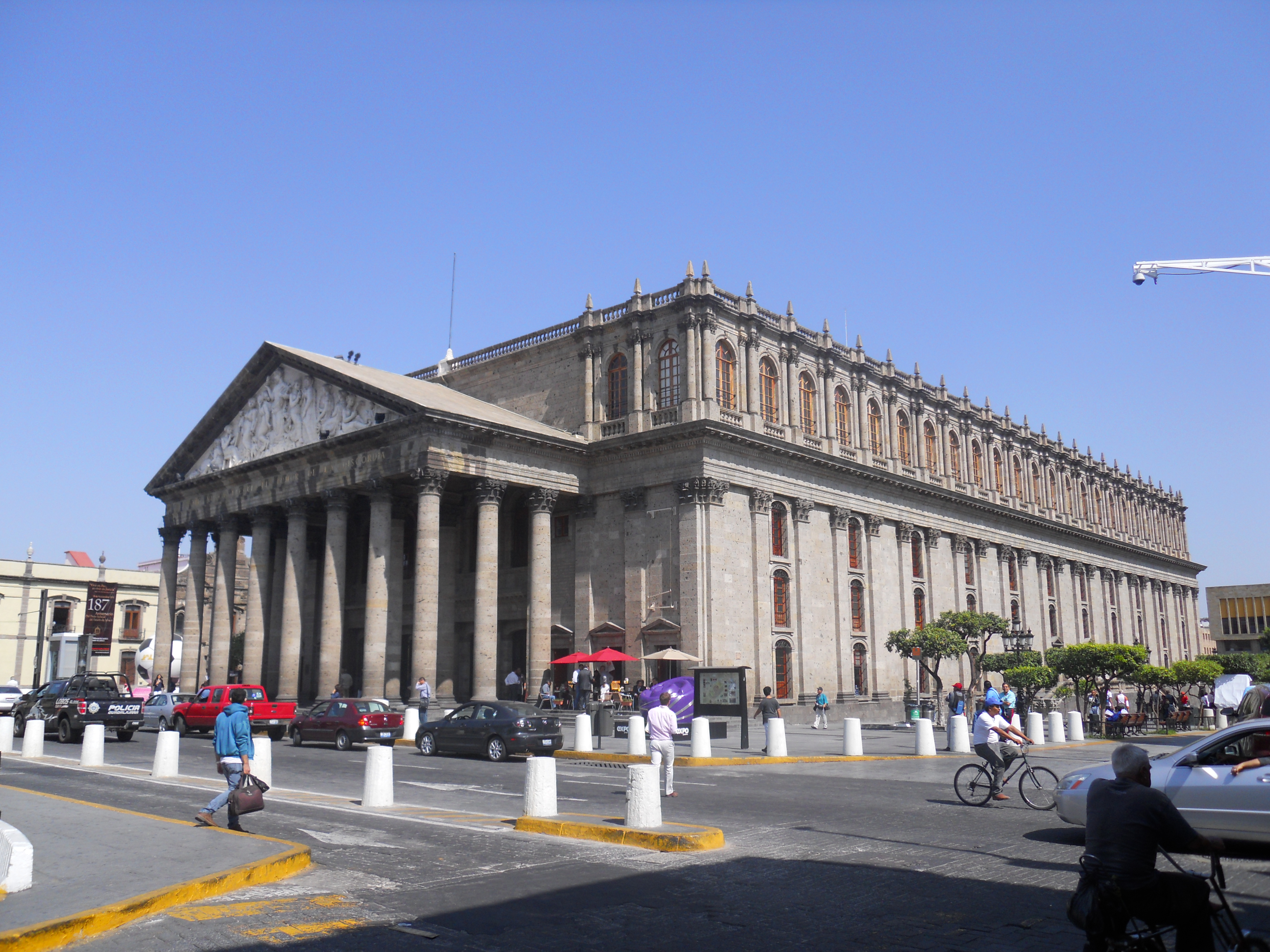
Side view

Degollado Theater is famous for its beautiful paintings along its golden walls on the interior of the building and its symbolic mosaic on the exterior. Several measurements of the Theater:

- Building measures 97 m long, 36.4 m wide, and 22.5 m high.
- Stage measures 54 m by 18 m.
- Oval hall measures 10 m × 6.5 m wide.
- Building capacity of 1,015 spectators.

=== Interior ===
Most of the theater's renovations were made to improve the interior design by adding paintings and giving it its current red and golden color. Before the theater's first inauguration, Gerardo Suárez and Carlos Villaseñor decorated the theater with a mural representing Dante Alighieri's fourth canto in the Divine Comedy. On 1877, Fermín Riestra was ordered to continue with the construction of the building; a three-year process on which a gilded eagle holding a Mexican flag on its talons and a chain on its beak was placed on the center of the inner arch of the building. Within the three year construction, Felipe Castro painted the murals Time and Hours and The Fame on the proscenium arch. Between 1880 and 1890, the stucco on the concert hall was completed and a golden color was added to the interior walls. By 1893, tiles were removed from the stage, due to the lack of support they provided for the structure, and were replaced by a metal arch on 1905. Between 1909 and 1910 artist Roberto Montenegro focused on the reconstruction and decoration of the interior of the building which included the addition of a crystal lamp on the theater's vault. Fifty years later, architect Ignacio Diaz Morales was in charge of a complete restoration of the building where sculptures by Benito Castañeda replaced Venetian mosaics. In May 2001, a chamber hall that can hold 200 people was added to the inside of the building.

=== Exterior ===
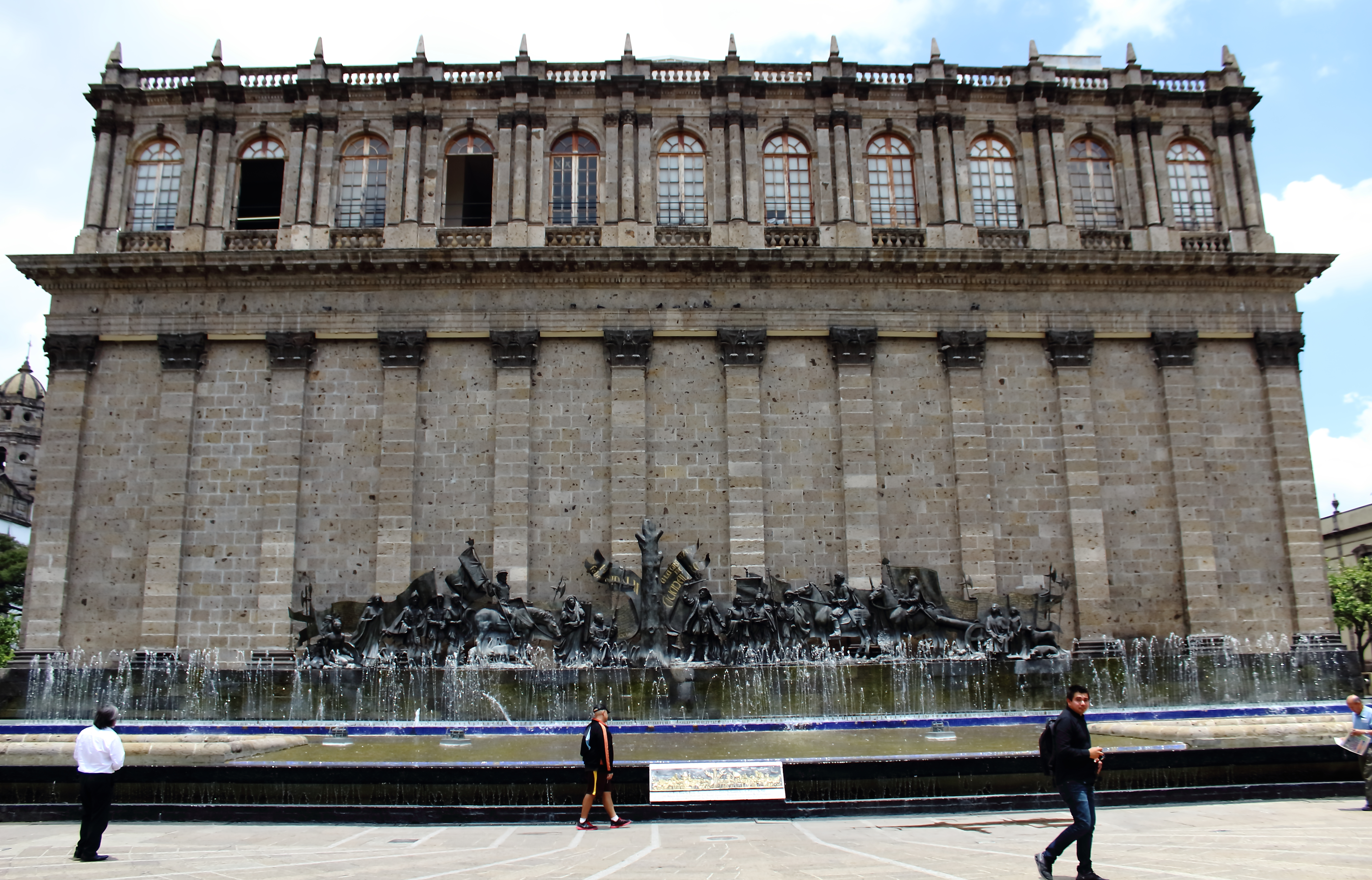
The frieze on the exterior of Teatro Degollado

With fewer renovations than the interior, the exterior of the building still retains its artistic beauty. Between 1953 and 1959 Montenegro painted the mosaic of Apollo and the nine muses on the pediment of the theater. The portico supporting the pediment consists of 16 Corinthian columns. When Ignacio Diaz was in charge of the renovation of the theater, he ordered the engraving of the phrase "May we never hear a hint of discord" along Montenegro's mosaic on the main entrance.

The Friso de los Fundadores de Guadalajara is installed on the building's exterior facing Plaza Fundadores. Completed by Rafael Zamarripa, the high bronze relief measures 3 m high x 21 m long and depicts the founders of Guadalajara.
