= Juan Bonilla (writer) =

Spanish writer

Juan Bonilla (born 1966) is a Spanish writer. He was born in Jerez de la Frontera. He has published several collections of short stories, including Tanta gente sola (Seix Barral, 2009), and Una manada de ñus(Pre-Textos, 2013). As a novelist, his notable works include Nadie conoce a nadie (Ediciones B, 1996), which was turned into a successful film by Mateo Gil, and Los príncipes nubios (Seix Barral, 2003), which won the Premio Biblioteca Breve in 2003. Los príncipes nubios has also been translated into several languages; the French version won the Prix littéraire des Jeunes européens in 2009.

Bonilla has also published works of non-fiction, notably a biography of the writer Terenci Moix, titled La vida es un sueño pop. Vida y obra de Terenci Moix (RBA, 2012). This book won the Premio Gaziel de Biografías y Memorias in 2011. Bonilla's next novel Prohibido entrar sin pantalones (Seix Barral, 2013) treats the Russian avant-garde poet Vladimir Mayakovsky as its subject. The novel has received extravagant critical praise and won the I Premio Bienal de Novela Vargas Llosa to the best novel published in Spanish in 2012/2013, endowed with $100,000. Vargas Llosa wrote about this book: "An astute, invisible and multifaceted narrator tells the story pretending to be a dispassionate chronicler and, suddenly, he becomes what he tells (...) There is no censorship between the objective and subjective, present and past, the private and the public, in the serpentine prose of this excellent novel that narrates while it creates and transgresses all the borders".

His latest novel Totalidad sexual del cosmos, about the Mexican artist and model Nahui Olin, published in 2019 (Seix-Barral), garnered him the Spanish National Book Award in 2020. It is a story of love and ghosts. In 1920s Mexico, Nahui Olin was everybody's favourite muse. She was painted by Diego Rivera and Roberto Montenegro, photographed by Edward Weston and Antonio Garduño and drawn by Matias Santoyo and Dr. Atl. Being an artists’ model was something of a disadvantage to her career as a painter and poet. It was never fully appreciated that for Nahui Olin, being the inspiration for paintings, drawings and poems was part of her creative expression. In fact, her first exhibition contained nothing she had made herself, only pieces she had inspired. In the 1930s, after the death of her great love, ship's captain Eugenio Agacino, she withdrew from artistic circles, seeming to care little that old friends thought she had lost her mind. She lived on for decades in relative obscurity, devoted to scientific research; she attempted to develop Einstein's theory of relativity. Meanwhile, the artists with whom she had shared her youth became increasingly famous. Nahui Olin died alone and almost forgotten in 1978. On that very day, a young mural restorer called Tomas Zurián stumbled across a photograph of her as a young woman. Intrigued, he set out on a journey of discovery that was to take years, full of such strange coincidences he was ultimately convinced that Nahui Olin herself was showing him the way. Fifteen years later, Zurián, who had given up everything for his obsession, exhibited the artist's work for the first time. Since then, recognition of her importance, rebelliousness and reputation have gone from strength to strength, sparking universal admiration and debate. "Sexual Totality of the Cosmos" was the title of a book Nahui Olin left unfinished, conceived of as a repository for all her knowledge, poetry and science, painting and music. It is also a novel that tells the fascinating story of the artist as well as the man who dedicated his life to rescuing her from unwarranted obscurity.

Bonilla has also compiled his poems in the volume Hecho en falta (Visor, 2014). The collection 'Six stories' is available in English translated from Spanish by Rupert Glasgow (Ankor Wat Words Collection, Dark Mirror Editions, 2004)., also his novel The Nubian Prince, translated by Esther Allen (Picador, 2007).
