= Carmen Mondragón =

Mexican artist (1893–1978)

Nahui Olin
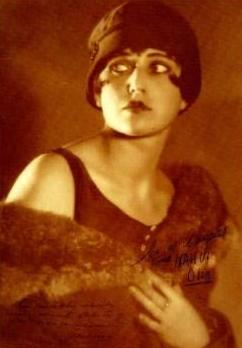
- Born: María del Carmen Mondragón Valseca; July 8, 1893; Tacubaya (modern Mexico City), Mexico
- Died: January 23, 1978 (aged 84); Mexico City, Mexico
- Spouse: Manuel Rodríguez Lozano (m. 1913; sep. 1921)
- Partner: Gerardo Murillo (1921–1925)
- Children: 1
- Modeling information
- Hair color: Dark Brown varying to Blonde
- Eye color: Green

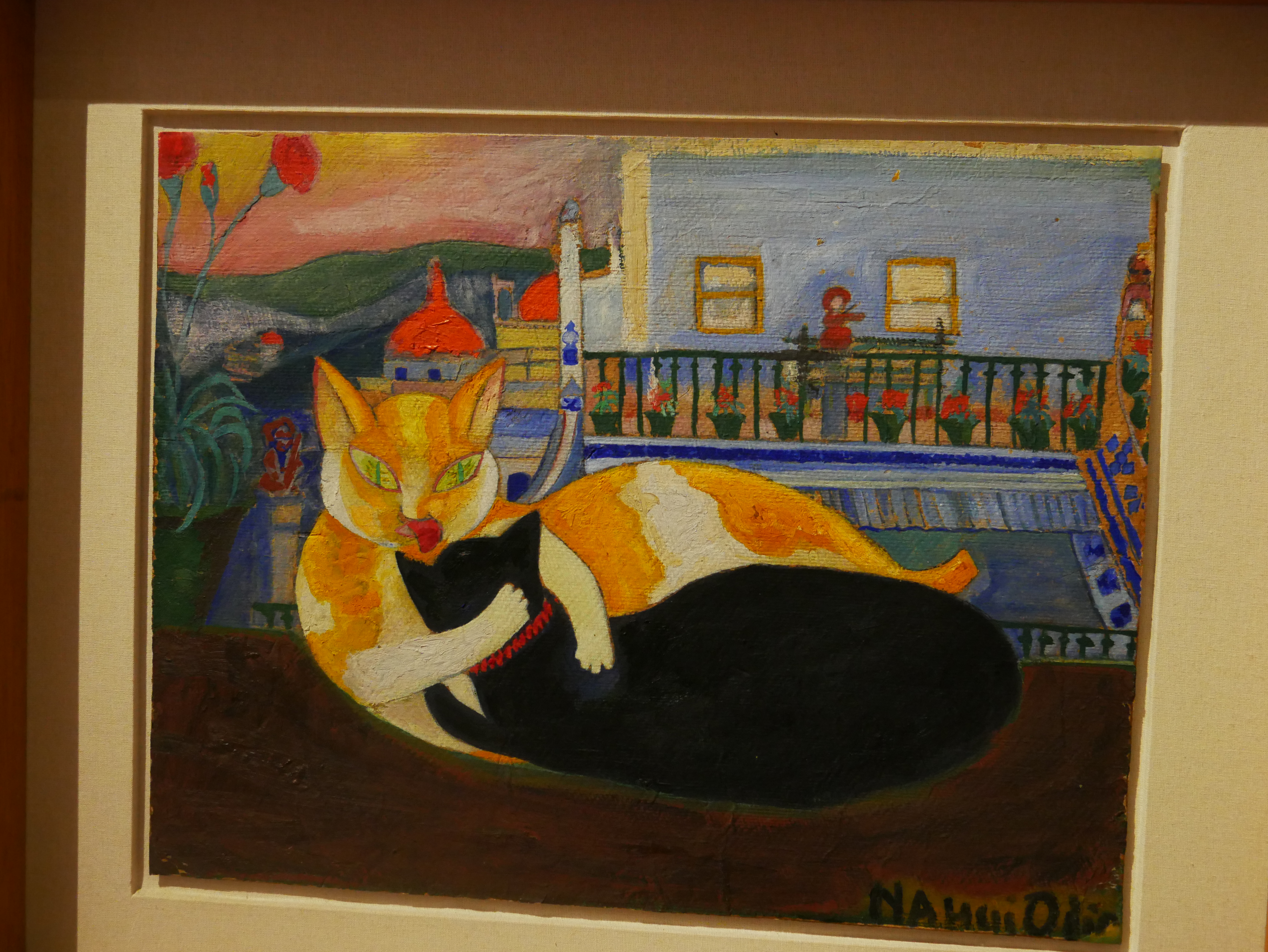
Gatos amorosos, ca. 1929

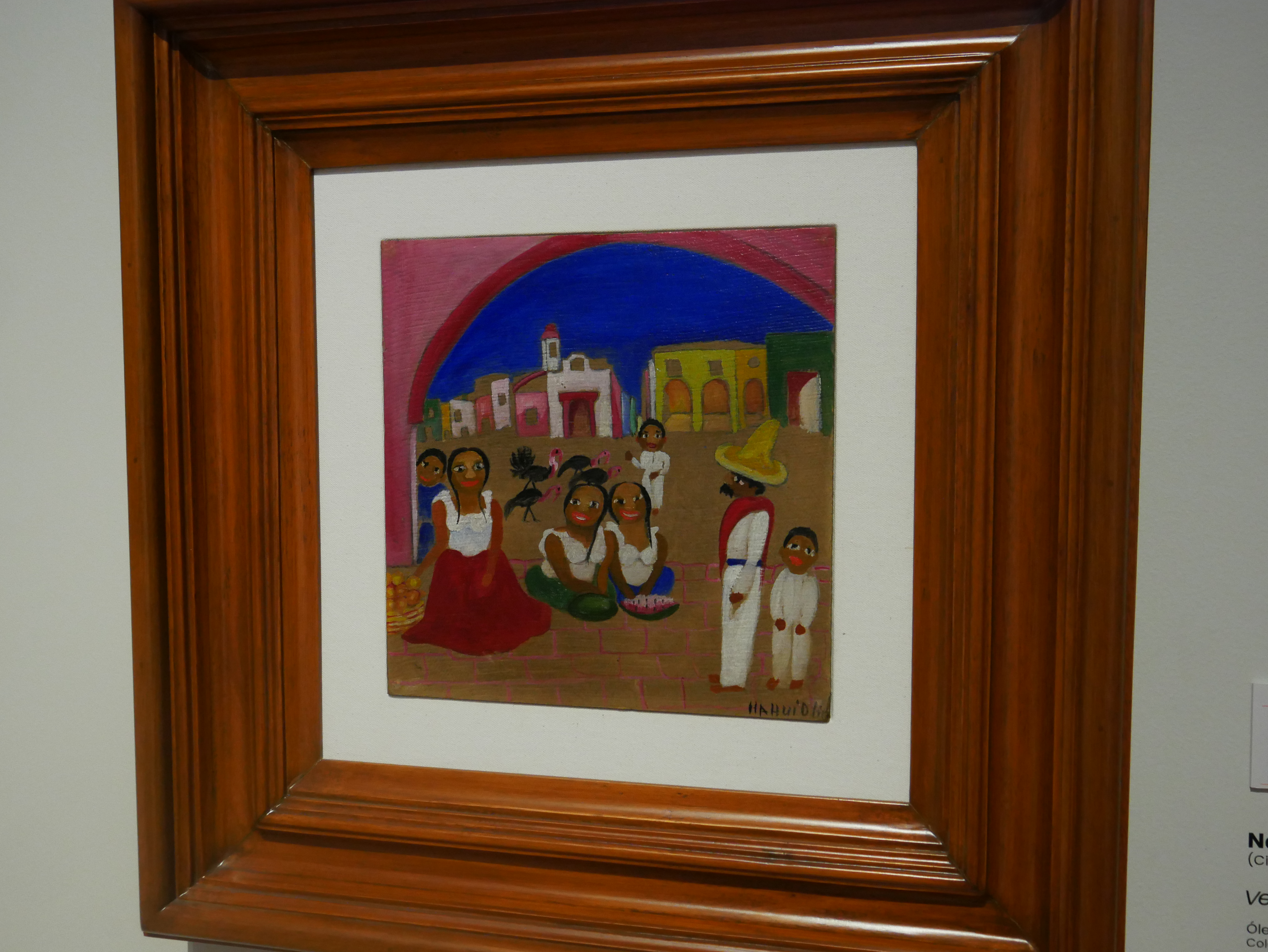
Vendiendo sandías, ca. 1937

María del Carmen Mondragón Valseca (Note: In this Mexican name, the surname is Mondragón and the second or maternal family name is Valseca.) (July 8, 1893 – January 23, 1978), also known as Nahui Olin, was a Mexican painter, poet, and artist's model.

== Biography ==
Carmen Mondragón was the fifth of eight children of General Manuel Mondragón, Secretario de Guerra y Marina in 1913 and inventor of the Mondragón rifle. Her mother was Mercedes Valseca. Carmen Mondragón received a privileged, private education in Mexico. Afterwards, she spent 1897 to 1905 in France, where she learned to speak French fluently. The professional activities of General Mondragón, who specialized in artillery design, led the family to Spain in 1905, where she met cadet Manuel Rodríguez Lozano, whom she married on August 6, 1913. The couple had a child in 1914, but the infant died shortly after birth. Rodríguez Lozano stated that Mondragón smothered the child but her family denied it.

Although her father, General Mondragón, was exiled to Belgium following the Decena Trágica, Carmen Mondragón moved to Paris with her husband, where they met Pablo Picasso, Henri Matisse, and Jean Cocteau. Afterwards they moved to San Sebastián, Spain, where Carmen's brother Manuel ran a photo studio. In San Sebastián, she started painting.

In 1921, Carmen and her husband returned to Mexico and separated. Whether they were ever officially divorced is unknown. Carmen Mondragón turned towards the artists' scene of Mexico City; becoming acquainted with José Vasconcelos and Xavier Villaurrutia. Additionally, she was interested in the Teatro Ulises movement. She had multiple sexual affairs. Her beauty is described as mesmerizing and erotic, and she was apparently the first woman in Catholic Mexico to wear a miniskirt. She became a model of several notable painters and photographers, among others posing for some of Diego Rivera's murals, for Tina Modotti, Antonio Garduño, Roberto Montenegro, Matías Santoyo, Edward Weston, and in 1928 for Ignácio Rosas at the Escuela Nacional de Bellas Artes. Her nudes became especially famous. When a former French teacher of her recognized her pictures, he published A dix ans sur mon pupitre (From my desk, at 10 years old), a 1924 book, which describes the 10-year-old pupil Carmen Mondragón within the teacher's sight. Carmen Mondragón had an intense love relationship with Gerald Murillo, also known as Dr Atl, who named her "Nahui Olin", a symbol of Aztec renewal meaning "four movement", the symbol of earthquakes. They lived together in the former La Merced Cloister. At this time she wrote her poems Óptica cerebral, poemas dinámicos (1922) and Calinement je suis dedans (1923), finished several naïve paintings, and composed. As intensely as the love relationship began, it ended just as quickly in the mid 1920s. Later she denied it completely. After having several further affairs, she stepped out of public life in the 1940s.

She gained greater recognition posthumously; following a similar trajectory of fame as that of Frida Kahlo's. Carmen Mondragón is considered a talented and revolutionary woman who both embraced and shaped the 1920s and 1930s in Mexico through her activism and creativity. She has been likened to Guadalupe Marín, Antonieta Rivas Mercado, Frida Kahlo, Tina Modotti, Lupe Vélez and María Izquierdo. Unlike Kahlo, her popularity was due more to her enchanting beauty than to her artistic and literary work. She reflectively described her work as intuitive. All her self-portraits show oversized, green eyes, but her eyes seem highlighted also in paintings by other artists. Many of her works are undated.

Her works were exhibited in the National Museum of Mexican Art in Chicago in 2007, in an exhibition titled A Woman Beyond Time/Nahui Olin: una mujer fuera del tiempo.

In 2019 the Spanish novelist Juan Bonilla published his novel Totalidad sexual del Cosmos, inspired by the life of Nahui Olin. In 2020, it won Spain's National Prize for Literature.

== Literature ==
- Adriana Malvido on YouTube: Nahui Olin, la mujer del sol, ISBN 84-7765-206-6, ISBN 978-84-7765-206-9
- Pino Cacucci: Nahui, 2005, ISBN 88-07-01686-9
- Dr. Atl: Gentes Profanas En El Convento, ISBN 970-727-034-9, ISBN 978-970-727-034-3
- Juan Bonilla: Totalidad sexual del cosmos, ISBN 9788432234903, ISBN 9788432235160
- Sandra Frid: La mujer que nació tres veces: la novela de Nahui Olin, ISBN 978-607-07-6274-1
