= Statue of Dr. Atl =

Statue in Guadalajara, Jalisco, Mexico

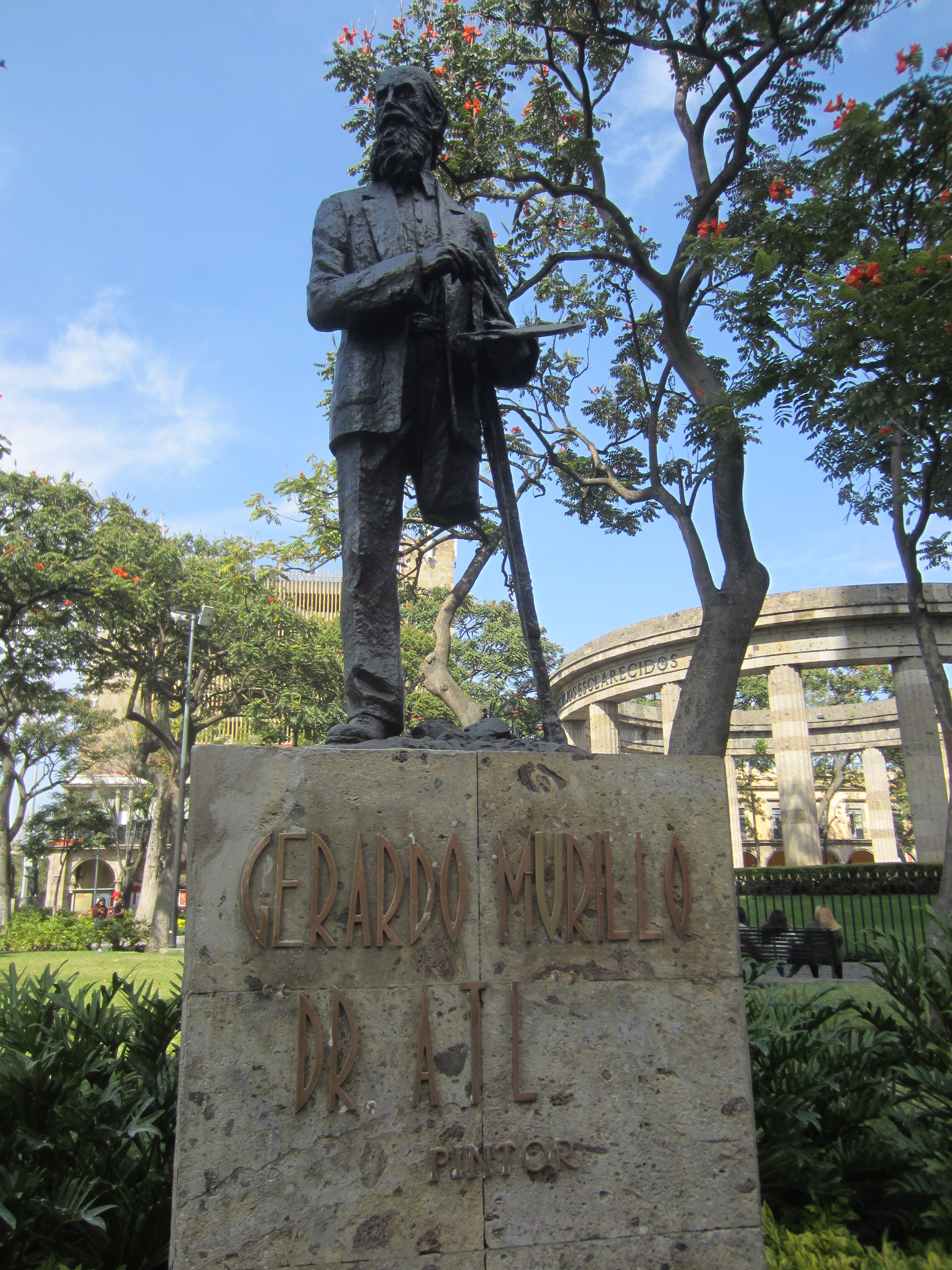
- The statue in 2021
- Subject: Dr. Atl
- Location: Guadalajara, Jalisco, Mexico; 20°40′39″N 103°20′49.9″W

A statue of Dr. Atl is installed along the Rotonda de los Jaliscienses Ilustres, in Centro, Guadalajara, in the Mexican state of Jalisco. Dr. Atl had his right leg amputated due to an accident during the 1943 Paricutín eruption, but the statue has the left leg missing instead.
