= Fabio Arrazola de Mondragone =

D. Fabio Arrazola de Mondragone (Aversa, 1539 - Naples, 1586), also known as The Marquess of Mondragone, was an Italian nobleman of Spanish descent who was an important figure in the court of Francesco I de' Medici until his exile in 1575. His Florence Palazzo served as meeting place between the Grand Duke and Bianca Cappello.

== Biography ==
Fabio Arrazola was born in Aversa as son of the Spanish Francisco Arrazola de Mondragone and his Italian wife Violante de Vento. His father was member of the Spanish Arrazola family and came to Italy as a squire in the escort of Eleanor of Toledo. At around 1539, an adolescent Fabio moved to Florence.

In 1550 he married Doña Anna de Pontes, one of the Grand Duchess' Ladies-in-waiting.

Arrazola had at least two daughters and a son with her before 1564; Violant, Maria and Pietro. Francesco de Medici authorised the gift of a dowry from his own monte di pietà account for the wedding of one of Fabio's daughters to Giovanni Ramirez di Montalvo. In the end, however, it was his son Pietro who married Anna Ramirez di Montalvo, who started calling herself Duchess of Mondragon.

== Career ==
=== The Climb ===
Arrazola's whereabouts in Florence remain unclear until he enters the Grand Ducal household in 1543 as a page to Eleanor of Toledo. A year later, the Grand Duchess orders a special costume for Arrazola that must be different from a standard page's livery. Between 1547 and 1552 Arrazola is a squire in the Grand Ducal household.

In 1552, Fabio Arrazola is appointed personal tutor to the young Francesco de Medici. The assignment of educator and supervisor of the young prince is a sign of Arrazola's good reputation at Court, and of the great admiration and trust Eleonora and Cosimo have in him. This becomes even more evident in the two "Libri Maestri di Eleonora" from 1554–58 and 1558–60, listing the Duchess's most faithful delegates trusted with managing monetary gifts and donations. In 1559, Fabio Arrazola also appears for the first time on the list of Gentilhombre de la casa del príncipe.

His success with the Grand Ducal family didn't go unnoticed. Contemporary chroniclers noted Fabio's special talent for remaining in the best graces of the young prince; one recounted that the Spaniard received "countless favors and gifts from him and his friends".

Most of these gifts were confiscated from nobles that had fallen in disgrace. As such, in 1559 Arrazola receives the belongings of Alessandro Riccardi, those of Antonio de Nobili and Niccolò Alemanni, as well as a salary of 25scudi per month.

When Francesco was set to meet with Philip II of Spain in 1562, the Prince was adamant that Arrazola would accompany him. Arrazola will eventually stay at the Madrid Court for a full year. During the meeting on 15 September 1562 in Segovia, the Spanish King agreed on admitting Arrazola to the Order of Santiago, which eventually became official in 1564.

In 1570, Arrazola buys a property in the Via dei Banchi from the Ricasoli family for the price of 350 scudi. He subsequently hires Bartolomeo Ammannati to redesign and rebuild it into a proper palazzo, Palazzo Mondragone. In this city palace Arrazola started housing his vast collection of Italian Renaissance art, as noted by Vasari in his famous Vite.

=== The Fall ===
In 1575 Fabio Arrazola suddenly got stripped of all his titles and functions, and was expelled from Florence. This was the result of a failed bargain between Francesco and Philip II of Spain, and Arrazola's interference therein.

The King of Spain had written Francesco a letter asking to borrow 8,000 scudi, for which the Grand Duke would get the rights to Porto Ercole in return. The Grand Duke is said to have discussed this with Arrazola, stating that if Florence would get hands on Porto Ercole, the whole of Siena would fall. Arrazola is then said to have written to King, warning him for this foolish trade. The Spanish King then called off the deal, quoting Arrazola's letter.

It is hitherto unclear if, or why Arrazola made this move, as he had everything he wanted in Florence. Some say that this could have been a result of Fabio's increasingly pompous intrusion in the Grand Duke's private life. It is quite apparent that Arrazola tried to compete and rival with Bianca Cappello and the figure of Jacopo Salviati. After the Pucci Conspiracy there might have been rightful doubts against a Spaniard coming so close to the Grand Duke.

== Owner of Art ==
Fabio Arrazola can not be considered to have been a patron of the arts, yet he did own a considerable collection that he bought from the original commissioners or acquired through his patronage at the Santa Maria Novella. Giorgio Vasari visited Palazzo Mondragone for his Vite.

Art owned by Fabio Arrazola de Mondragone
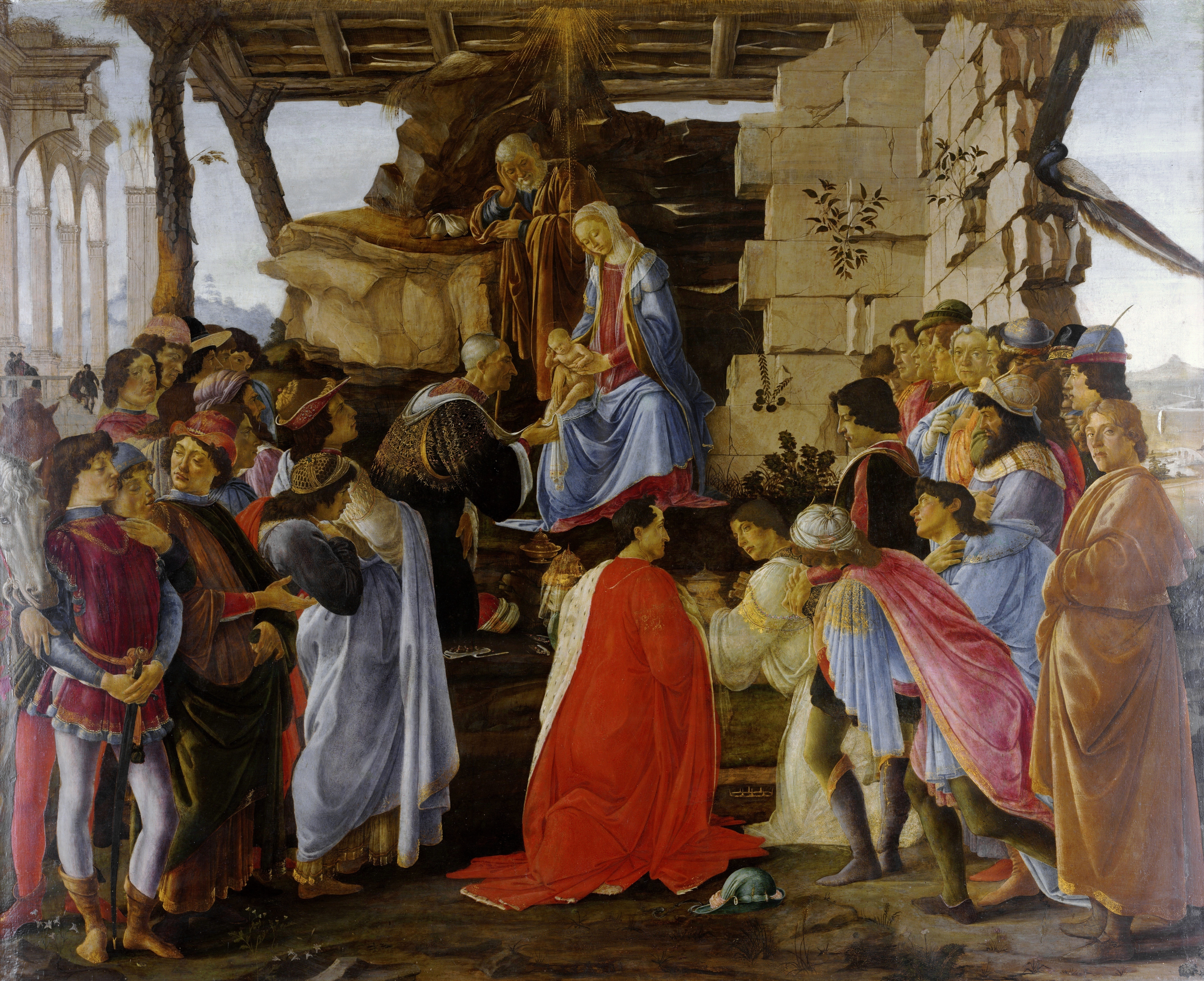
Adoration of the Magi by Sandro Botticelli

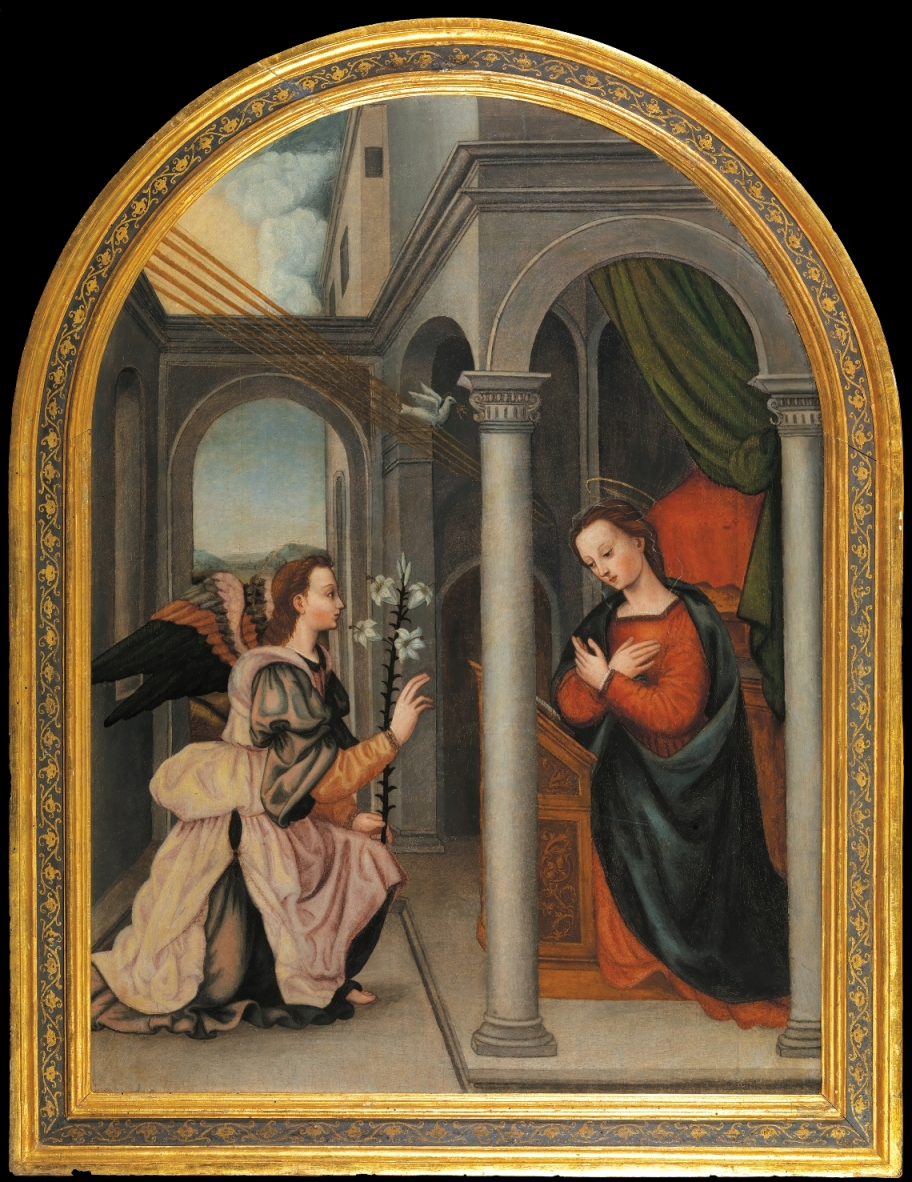
Annunciation, by Plautilla Nelli

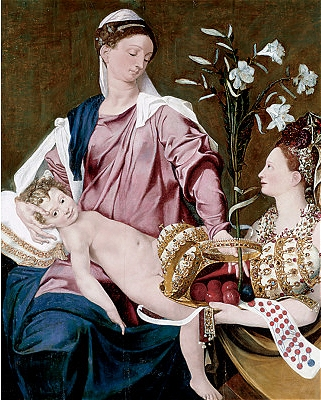
The Medici Madonna, by Benedetto Pagni

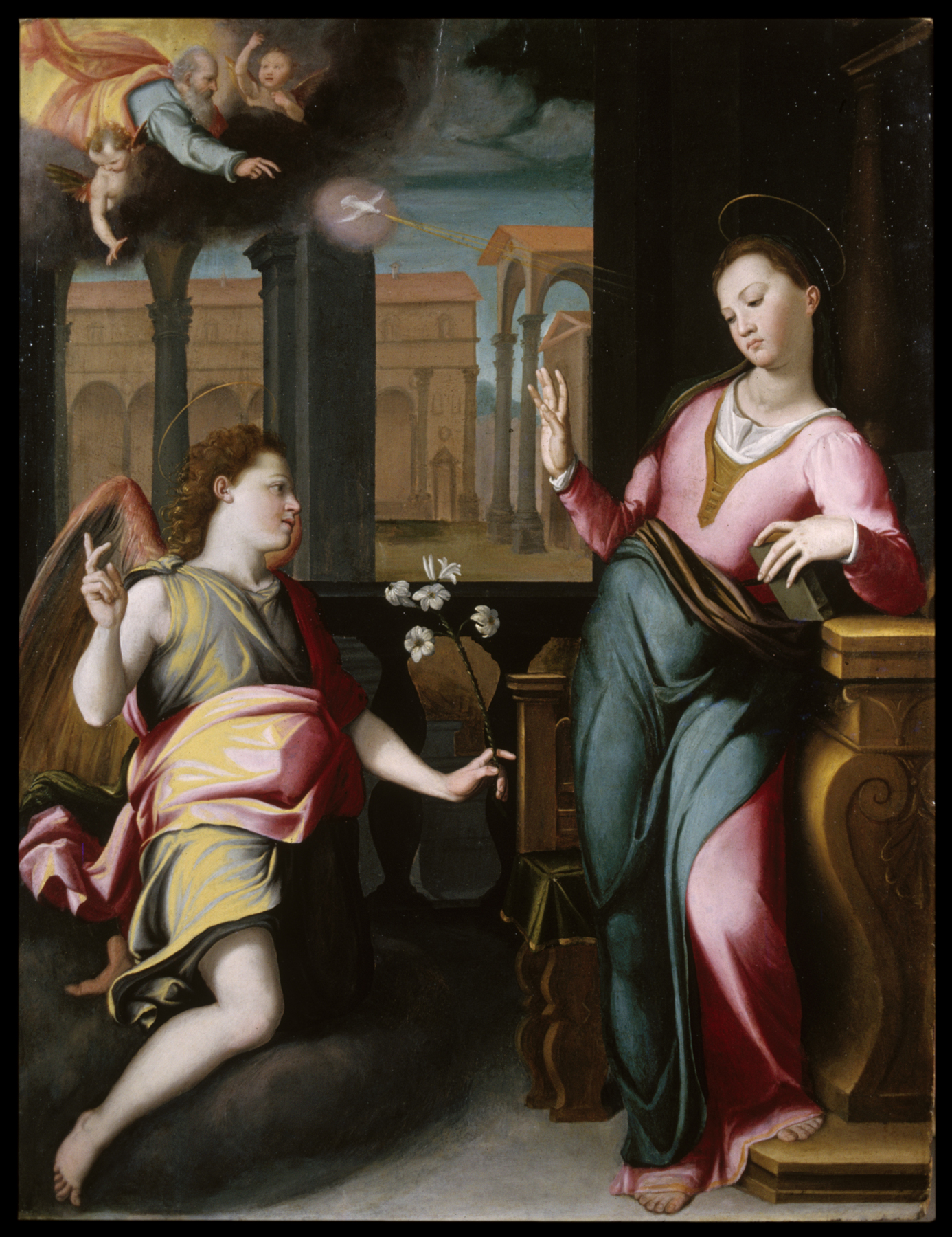
The Annunciation, by Santi di Tito
