= Rupert Glasgow =

British translator, philosopher and writer

- Born: 1964 (age 61–62); Sheffield, England

Rupert D. V. Glasgow (born 1964 in Sheffield, England) is an institutionally independent translator, philosopher and writer. Glasgow studied French and German at St. John's College, Oxford, UK. His translations from German into English include letters of Martin Heidegger to his wife. Translations from the Spanish include a collection of stories by Augusto Monterroso. Glasgow's writings concern the history of ideas, including comedy, laughter, the mind, as well as the concepts of water and of self. Glasgow taught philosophy courses on 'The Phylogeny of the Self' to biologists at the Leibniz Institute for Neurobiology, Magdeburg, and the University of Würzburg, Germany, and received a PhD for a thesis on this topic from the Graduate School of Humanities at the Julius-Maximilians University of Würzburg, Germany, under the supervision of Roland Borgards, Karl Mertens, and Martin Heisenberg. Upon invitation, Glasgow presented his work to the German Science Foundation Research Training Group Emotions at the Julius-Maximilians Universität Würzburg, Germany (2008), at the Centre for Genomic Regulation, Barcelona, Spain (2012), as well as at the Minibrains conference of the European Science Foundation/ European Molecular Biology Organization (2014).

== Bibliography ==
Publications

- R.D.V. Glasgow (1995). Madness, Masks and Laughter: An essay on comedy. Associated University Press.
- R.D.V. Glasgow (1997). Split Down the Sides: On the subject of laughter. University Press of America.
- R.D.V. Glasgow (1999). The Comedy of Mind: Philosophers stoned, or the pursuit of wisdom. University Press of America.
- R.D.V. Glasgow (2009). The Concept of Water. R. Glasgow Books. (now available via www.academia.edu)
- R.D.V. Glasgow (2017). The Minimal Self. Foreword by Roland Borgards, illustrations by Christina Nath. Würzburg University Press.
- B. Michels, T. Saumweber, R. Biernacki, J. Thum, R.D.V. Glasgow, M. Schleyer, Y.-c. Chen, C. Eschbach, R.F. Stocker, N. Toshima, T. Tanimura, M. Louis, G. Arias-Gil, M. Marescotti, F. Benfenati, B. Gerber (2017). Pavlovian conditioning of larval Drosophila: An illustrated, multilingual, hands-on manual for odor-taste associative learning in maggots. Frontiers in Behavioral Neuroscience, 11, 45.
- R.D.V. Glasgow (2018). Minimal Selfhood and the Origins of Consciousness. Illustrations by Christina Nath. Würzburg University Press.
- R.D.V. Glasgow (2019). Minimal selfhood, Journal of Neurogenetics, DOI: 10.1080/01677063.2019.1672680

Translations (selection)

- Martha Freud: A Biography, by Katja Behling, Cambridge: Polity Press, 2005 (translation of Martha Freud: Die Frau des Genies, Berlin: Aufbau, 2002)
- The Value of Privacy, by Beate Rössler, Cambridge: Polity Press, 2005 (translation of Der Wert des Privaten, Frankfurt-am-Main: Suhrkamp, 2001)
- The Black Sheep and Other Fables, by Augusto Monterroso, Tadworth: Acorn, 2005 (translated from the Spanish together with Philip Jenkins)
- Martin Heidegger: Letters to His Wife 1915–1970, ed. Gertrud Heidegger, Cambridge: Polity Press, 2008 (translation of Mein liebes Seelchen! Briefe Martin Heideggers an seine Frau Elfride 1915–1970, Munich, Deutsche Verlags-Anstalt, 2005)
- Six stories, by Juan Bonilla, Ankor Wat Words Collection, Dark Mirror Editions, 2004 (translated from Spanish)

Works language-edited (selection)

- Gerber B, Yarali A, Diegelmann S, Wotjak C, Pauli P, Fendt M 2014 Pain-relief learning in flies, rats, and man: Basic research and applied perspectives. Learning & Memory, 21, 232–252.
- Schleyer M, Miura D, Tanimura T, Gerber B 2015 Learning the specific quality of taste reinforcement in larval Drosophila. eLife, 4, e04711.
