= Mondragon =

Mondragon or Mondragón may refer to:

== Places ==
- Mondragon, Northern Samar, a municipality in the Philippines
- Mondragon, Vaucluse, a town and commune in France
- Mondragón, a town and municipality in the Basque region of Spain, famous for its cooperative movement
- Mondragon University, a private university in the Basque region of Spain

== People ==
- Cristóbal de Mondragón (1504–1596), Spanish soldier
- Faryd Mondragón (born 1971), Colombian football goalkeeper
- Jorge Mondragón (diver) (born 1962), Mexican diver
- Jorge Mondragón (actor) (1903–1997), Mexican actor
- Juan Carlos Mondragón (born 1951), Uruguayan writer
- Manuel Mondragón (1859–1922), Mexican general and firearm designer
- Martín Mondragón (born 1953), Mexican long-distance runner
- Michael Mondragon (born 1970), American professional wrestler
- Roberto Mondragón (1940–2026), American politician

=== Fictional characters ===
Mondragon is a surname used by the following fictional main characters from the Philippine drama series Kadenang Ginto:

- Cassandra "Cassie" Andrada-Mondragon, portrayed by Francine Diaz
- Romina Andrada-Mondragon, portrayed by Beauty Gonzalez
- Margaret "Marga" Mondragon-Bartolome, portrayed by Andrea Brillantes
- Daniela "Dani" Mondragon-Bartolome, portrayed by Dimples Romana
- Roberto "Robert" Agoncillo Mondragon, portrayed by Albert Martinez

== Other ==
- Mondragón CF, a Spanish football club from the city of same name
- Mondragón Cooperative Corporation (Spanish: Mondragón Corporación Cooperativa - MCC), a group of manufacturing and retail companies based in the Basque Country
- Mondragon Bookstore, a worker cooperative political bookshop and coffeehouse in Winnipeg, Manitoba
- Mondragón rifle, a Mexican semi-automatic rifle

== See also ==
- Mondragone, a municipality in Campania, Italy
- Palazzo Mondragone, a palace in Florence, Italy
- Villa Mondragone, a villa near Rome, Italy
  - Antinous Mondragone, a bust of Antinous found in the Roman villa
