= Dr. Atl =

Mexican artist (1875–1964)

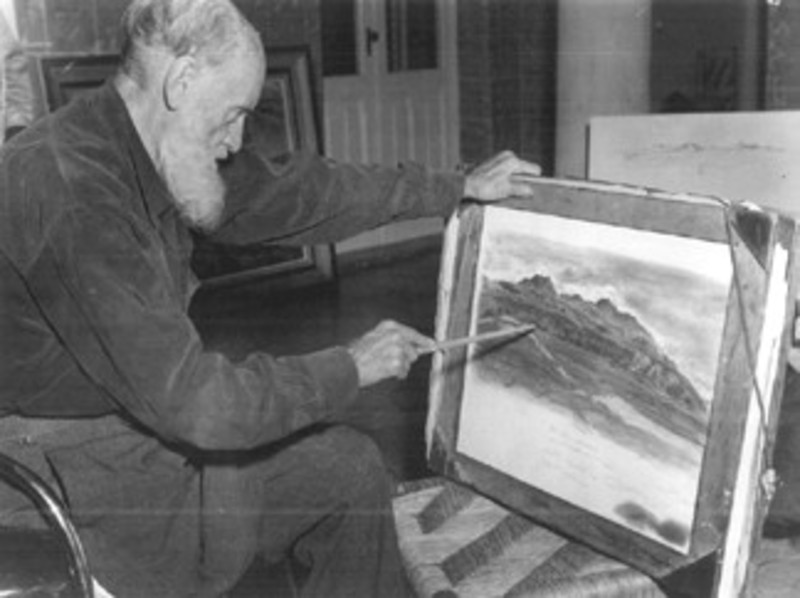
- Born: Gerardo Murillo Coronado; October 3, 1875; Guadalajara, Jalisco, Mexico
- Died: August 15, 1964 (aged 88); Mexico City, Mexico
- Resting place: Panteon de Dolores
- Partner: Carmen Mondragón (1921–1925)

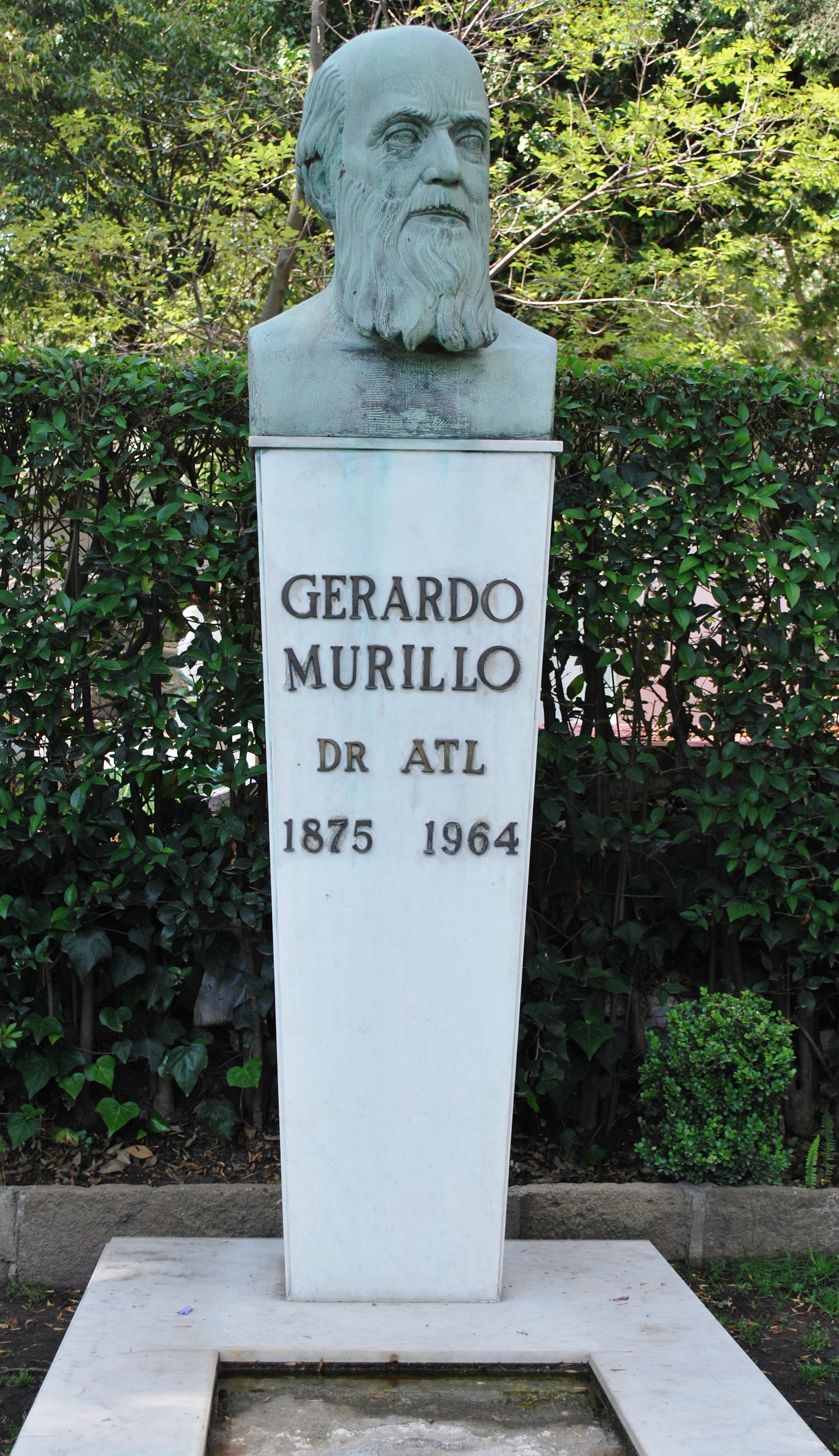
Tomb of Gerardo Murillo at the Panteón de Dolores cemetery in Mexico City

Gerardo Murillo Coronado, also known by his signature "Dr. Atl" (October 3, 1875 – August 15, 1964), was a Mexican painter, writer and intellectual. He is most famous for his works inspired by the Mexican landscape, particularly volcanoes, and for being one of the early figures of modern Mexican art.

Dr. Atl was a key figure in the development of Mexican muralism in the early 20th century, alongside artists like Diego Rivera and David Alfaro Siqueiros. His painting style was heavily influenced by the romanticism of the natural world, focusing on depicting Mexico's volcanic and montainous terrain.

In addition to his work as a painter, Dr. Atl was a strong advocate for the cultural and political identity of Mexico, emphasizing the importance of indigenous roots and the country's natural beauty. He was a prominent intellectual figure and made contributions to the Mexican artistic and political spheres during the early 20th century.

Dr. Atl was also known for his contributions to the development of modern Mexican art education, as well as his writing. His legacy as an artist and cultural figure remains significant in Mexican art history.

== Biography ==
Born in Guadalajara, Jalisco, he began studying painting at an early age, under Felipe Castro. At 21, Murillo entered the Academy of San Carlos in Mexico City to further his studies.

After demonstrating his talent, Murillo was awarded a grant in 1897 by the government of Porfirio Díaz to study painting in Europe. There he broadened his scope of learning, with study of philosophy and law at the University of Rome, and many trips to Paris to hear lectures on art given by Henri Bergson. His strong interest in politics led him to collaborate with the Socialist Party in Italy and work in the Avanti newspaper. In 1902 during a trip to Paris he took the signature name "Atl" (the Nahuatl word for "water"); Leopoldo Lugones added the "Dr." to it.

Dr. Atl became very active in Mexico when he returned. In 1906 he participated with Diego Rivera, Francisco de la Torre, Rafael Ponce de León and others in an exhibition sponsored by Alonso Cravioto and Luis Castillo Ledon, the editors of the magazine Savia Moderna.

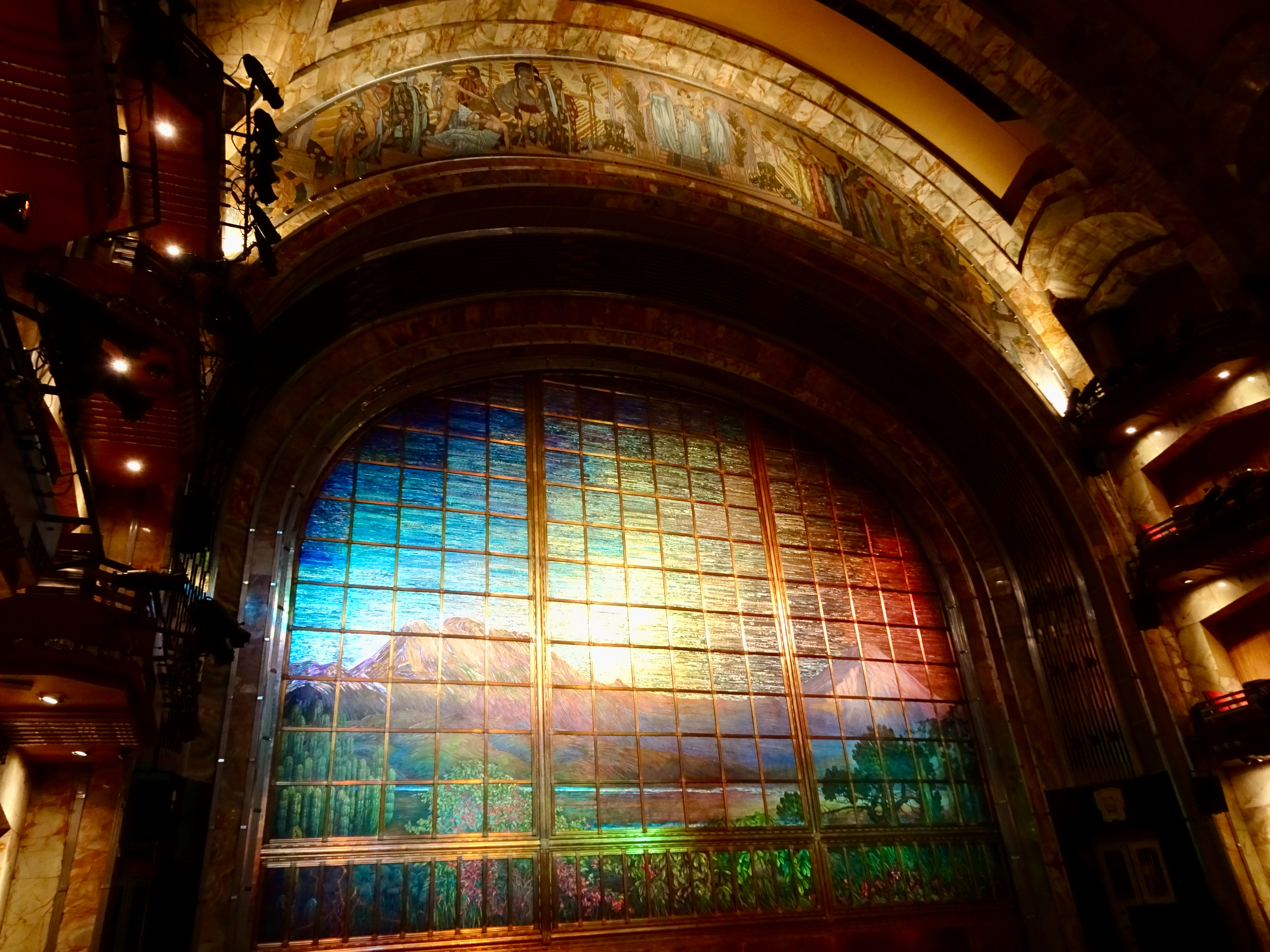
Glass curtain depicting two volcanoes, Palacio de Bellas Artes

In 1906, Dr. Atl issued a manifesto calling for the development of a monumental public art movement in Mexico linked to the lives and interests of the Mexican people, a precursor of the Mexican Mural Movement launched in 1922. He was also commissioned by the Díaz government to design a glass curtain for the Palacio de Bellas Artes (Palace of Fine Arts) under construction in Mexico City, which was executed by Tiffany's of New York. The curtain featured the two volcanoes overlooking the capital. He was also commissioned to paint a mural, which was postponed by the eruption of the Mexican Revolution against Porfirio Díaz in 1910.

In 1911, Dr. Atl returned to Europe. In Paris, he founded a journal and wrote about the social and political issues of Mexico, and criticized General Victoriano Huerta, who had helped overthrow the democratically elected government of Francisco I. Madero. Dr. Atl supported the Constitutionalist faction in the Mexican Revolution, leaning towards "biblical socialism" and promoting the growth of art, literature, and science. When he returned from Europe, he joined the Constitutionalist forces led by Venustiano Carranza, and was appointed Director of the Academy of San Carlos. During the Revolution, he persuaded two young art students, José Clemente Orozco and David Alfaro Siqueiros, to join the Carrancistas and illustrated La Vanguardia, the carrancista official paper.

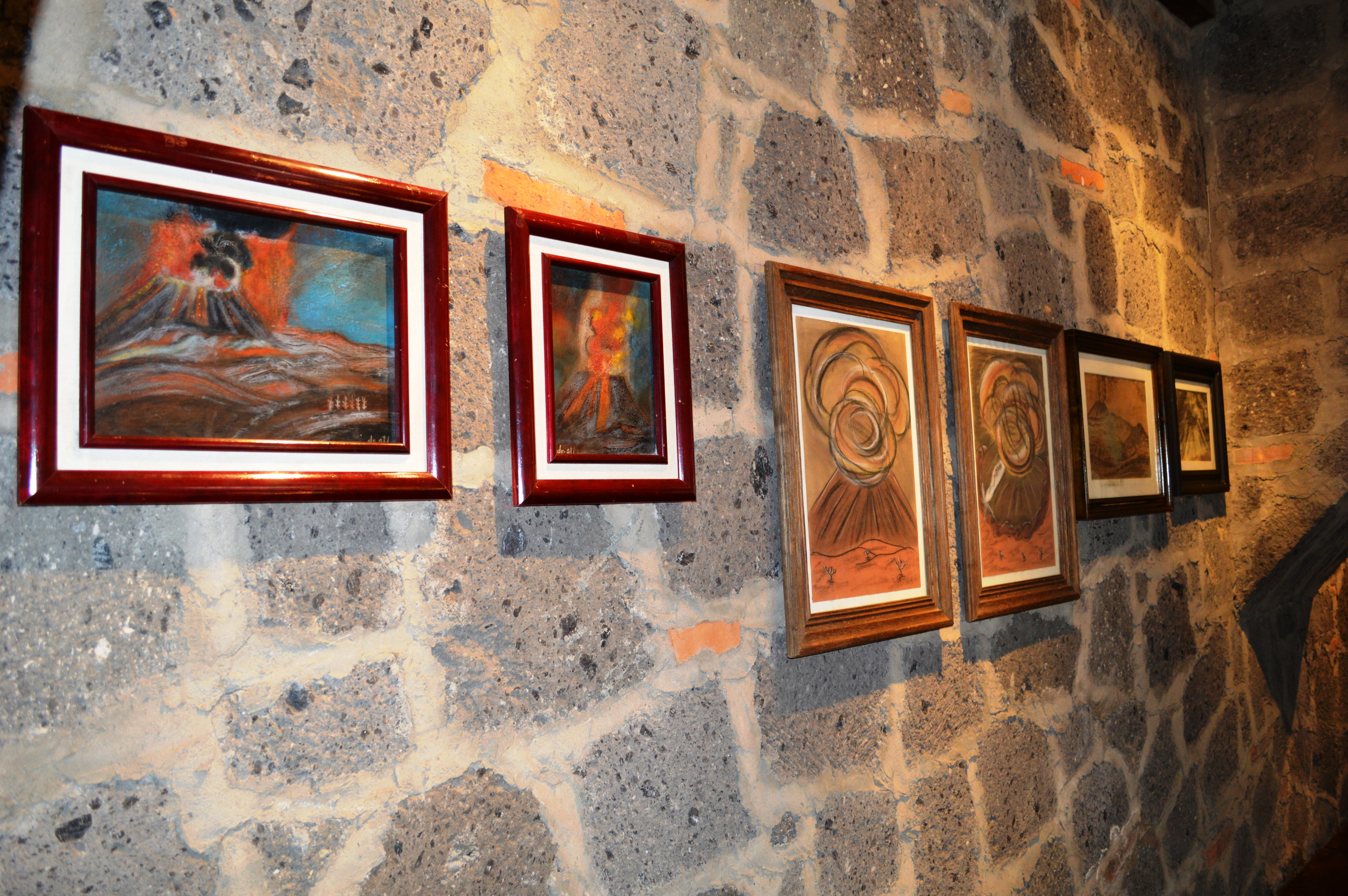
Works by Dr Atl at the Hacienda Santa Clara Study and Research Center in San Miguel Allende

The winning faction of the Revolution rejected the Euro-centric emphasis of the Mexican government in the 19th and early 20th century and following the Revolution, there was a revival of interest in Mexico's rich indigenous past and the popular arts, including folk dance, music, arts and crafts. Dr. Atl and other artists arranged exhibits of the folk arts and performances of popular dance and music and Dr. Atl prepared a two-volume study, Folk Arts in Mexico, published by the Mexican government in 1922.

He had ties to the socialist and anarchosyndicalist labor organization Casa del Obrero Mundial. During the 1930s and 1940s, Dr. Atl published frequent articles praising European fascism, especially Adolf Hitler. His interest in politics seemed to wane as he became more interested in the field of volcanology.

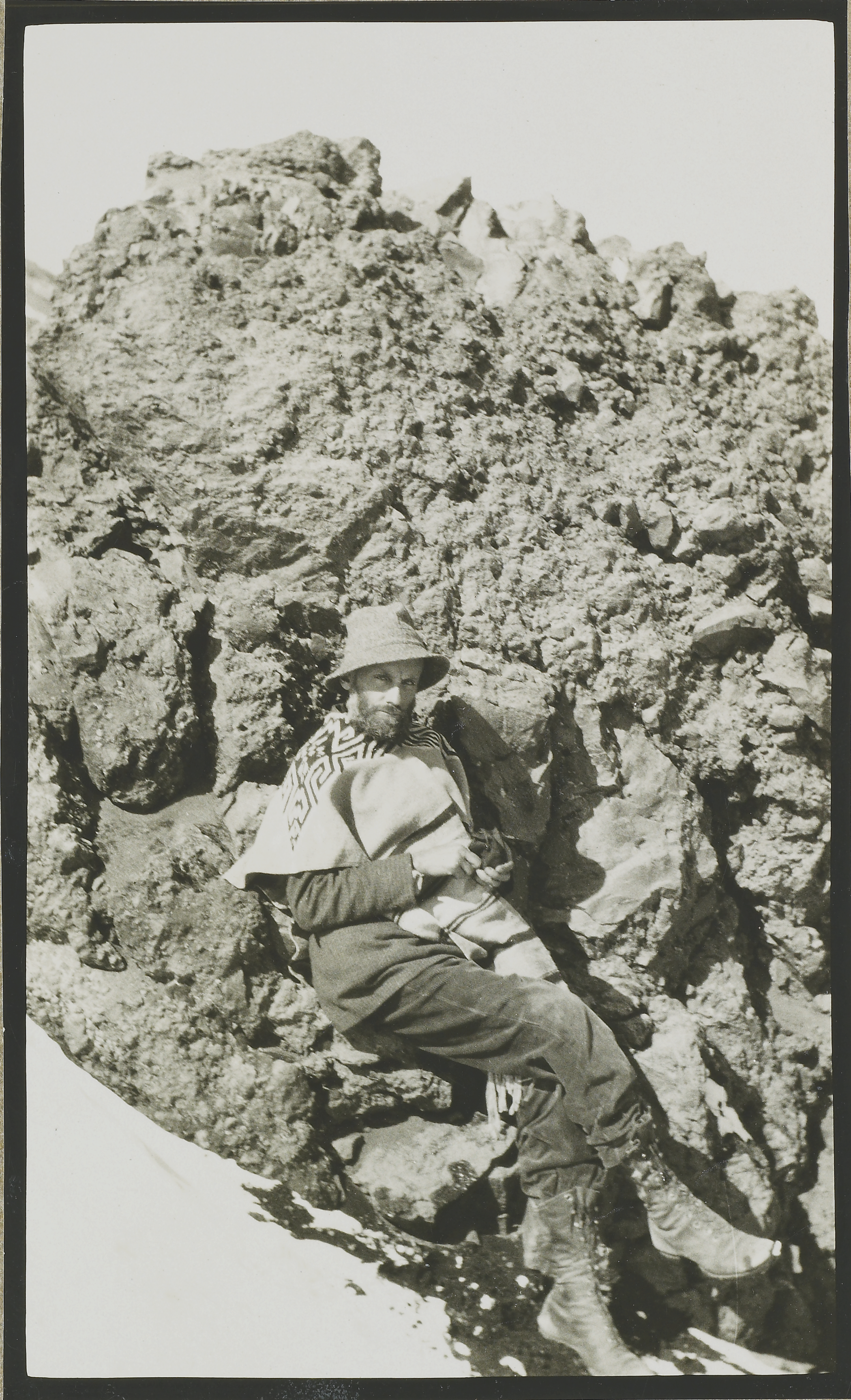
Dr. Atl at Popocatepetl November 1922

Dr. Atl's strong love of the outdoors and his active nature are seen in his many paintings which portray the landscapes of his era. Among his interests was the study of volcanoes, and he spent much time visiting both Popocatépetl and Iztaccíhuatl. At one time, he spent two years living on the mountainside of the Popocatépetl. In his 1950 book, Cómo nace y crece un volcán, el Paricutín ("How a Volcano is Born and Grows – Paricutín"), he told of his experience of witnessing the eruption of Paricutín in 1943. He was injured while observing the eruption and his leg was amputated. Besides painting volcanic landscapes, he was considered an expert volcanologist and his papers were valuable to understanding volcanos.

Dr. Atl was also an artistic and literary critic, and for a while head of the Instituto Nacional de Bellas Artes y Literatura (National Institute of Fine Arts and Literature).

He gave the Nahuatl name "Nahui Olin" (a symbol of Aztec renewal meaning "four movement," the symbol of earthquakes) to Carmen Mondragón (1893–1978), a Mexican poet and painter with whom he established a very intense love relationship.

The artist received numerous awards for his literature and art, including the Belisario Domínguez Medal of Honor, in 1956, and the National Prize for Arts in 1958.

Dr. Atl died in Mexico City in 1964 and is buried in Panteon Civil de Dolores cemetery in the capital, in the Rotunda of Illustrious Persons, an honor bestowed upon him for his contributions to the cultural field.

== As a writer ==
Dr. Atl wrote essays, scientific works, criticisms and short stories.

His first book from 1913, was Les volcans du Mexique. A two-volume study, Folk Arts in Mexico, published by the Mexican government in 1922.

Cuentos bárbaros was published in 1930. In that same year Gentes profanas en el convento was also published.

Cuentos de todos los colores ("Stories of All Colors") published in 1933, 1936 and 1941, which focuses on the themes of the Mexican Revolution and has been hailed as one of the best narrations of that historical period.

His book La Perla ("The Pearl") inspired the writing of the novella, much the same, by John Steinbeck.

In 1950 his book Cómo nace y crece un volcán. El Paricutín ("How a Volcano is Born and Grows, the Paricutín"), which describes how of a volcano was being formed within a few months, was published.

== Tribute ==
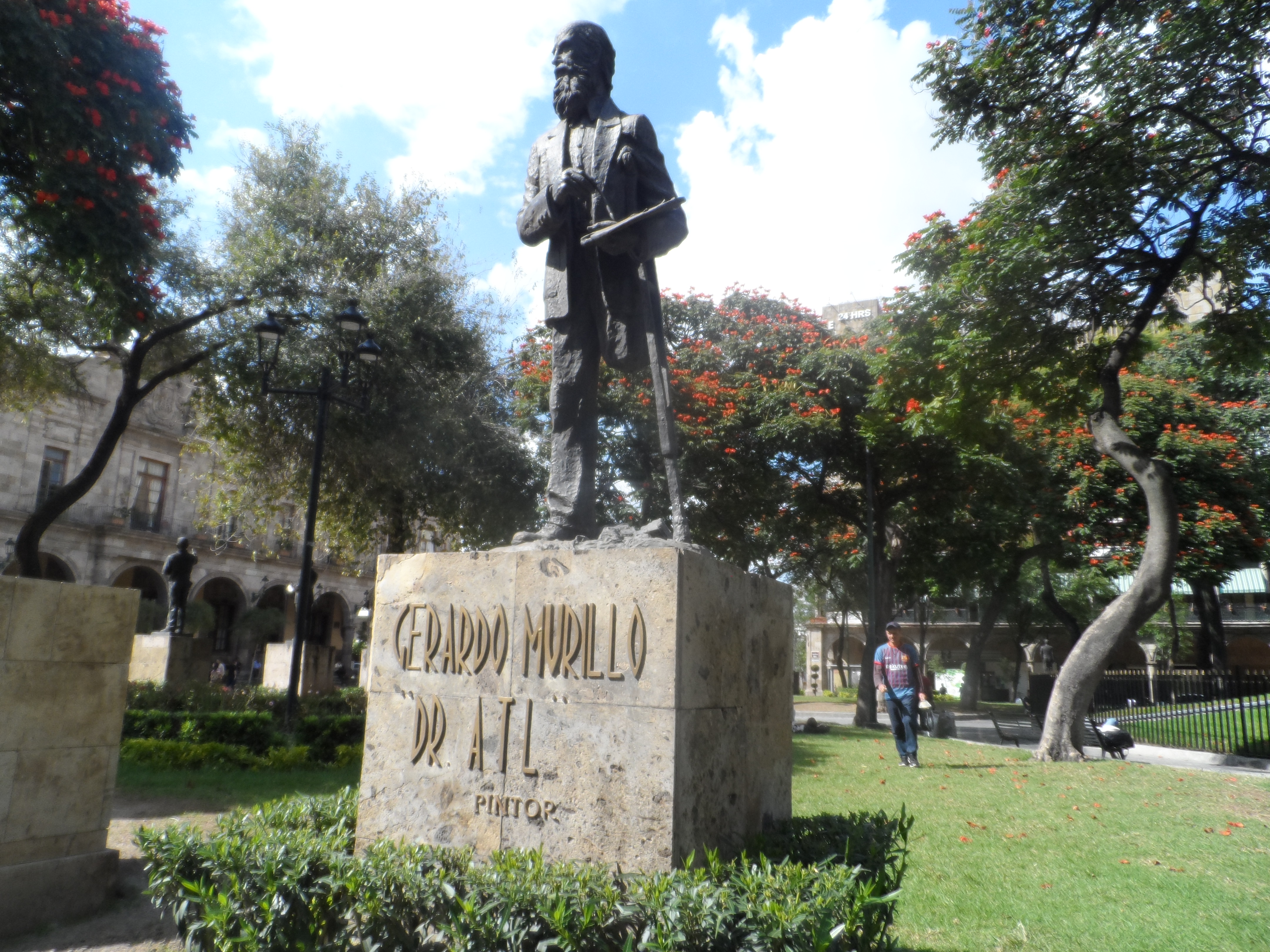
Statue of Dr. Atl in the "Roundabout of the Illustrious Jaliscienses"

A statue of Dr. Atl was erected in the 'Roundabout of the Illustrious Jaliscienses', in Guadalajara, as a tribute to the artist.

In 1961, Alcoa Presents: One Step Beyond aired an episode based on an experience of Dr. Atl in 1920. The plot description states: "On the run from the authorities, Atl (played by David J. Stewart) takes refuge in a convent that is allegedly haunted by the ghost of an Aztec warrior. Of course, Atl is too intelligent a man to believe in such nonsense—until the Federale who is pursuing him is mysteriously strangled to death. The real Dr. Atl makes a guest appearance in the closing scene."

Four chapters of Rebecca West's book Survivors in Mexico deal with the life of Dr. Atl.

On October 3, 2017, Google celebrated his 142nd birthday with a Google Doodle.

Preceded by Esteban Baca Calderón	Belisario Domínguez Medal of Honor; 1956	Succeeded by Roque Estrada Reynoso
