= Palazzo Mondragone =

Coordinates: 43°46′24.99″N 11°15′3.5″E

The Palazzo Mondragone, also known as Palazzo Mandragone, Ambron(n), Ricasoli di Meleto, or Peyron, is a palace located on Via del Giglio #4r-8r in central Florence, region of Tuscany Italy.

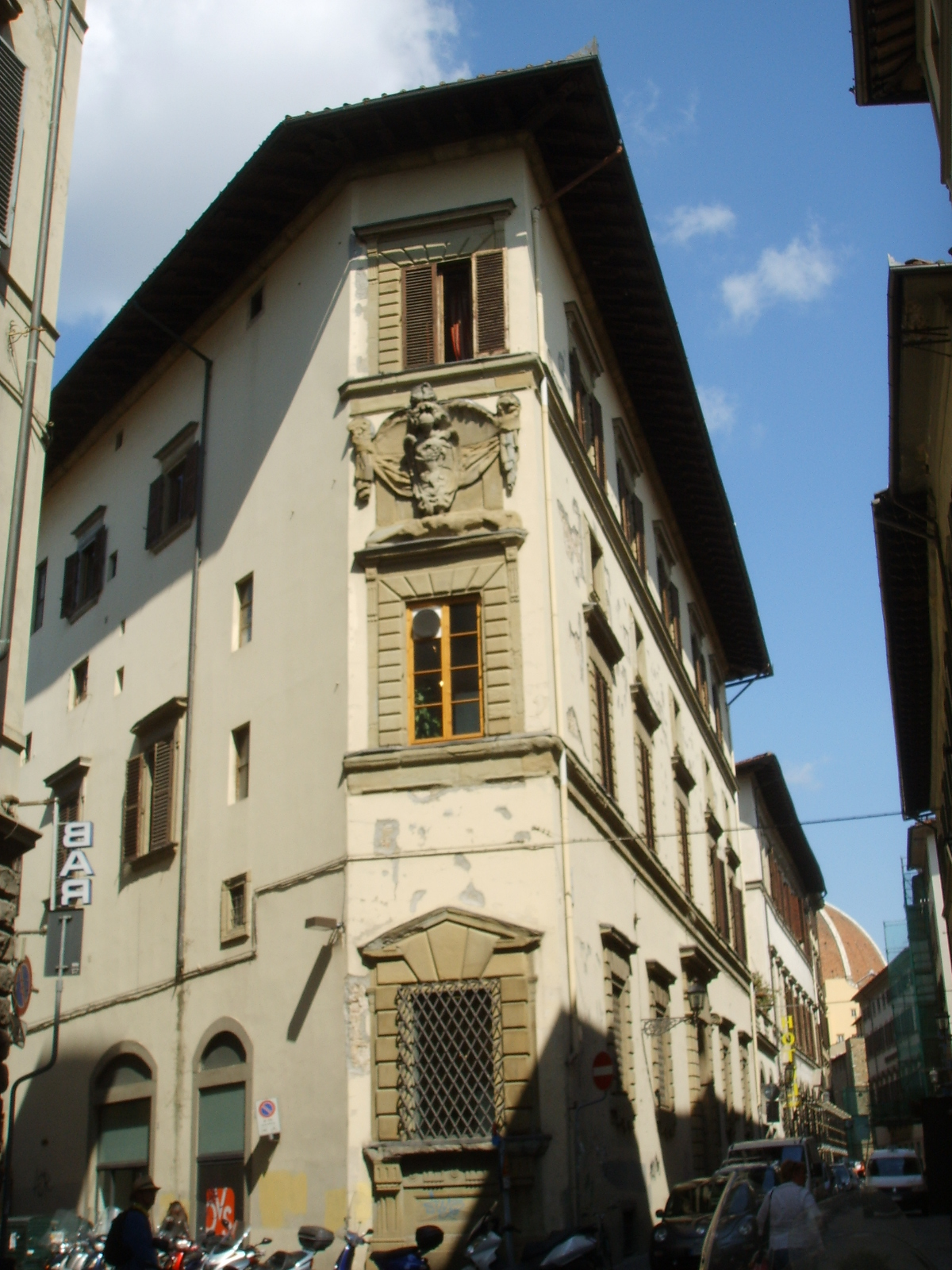
Palazzo Mondragone

The palace had been designed by the architect Bartolomeo Ammanati.

Although not originally built by him, the current name stems from Fabio Arrazola de Mondragone, a Medici court intimate from Spanish descent. Arrazola owned the Palace in the 15th century but ultimately fell in disgrace.
