= Montevideo =

Capital and largest city of Uruguay

Montevideo City of San Felipe and Santiago of Montevideo
- Capital city
- Montevideo
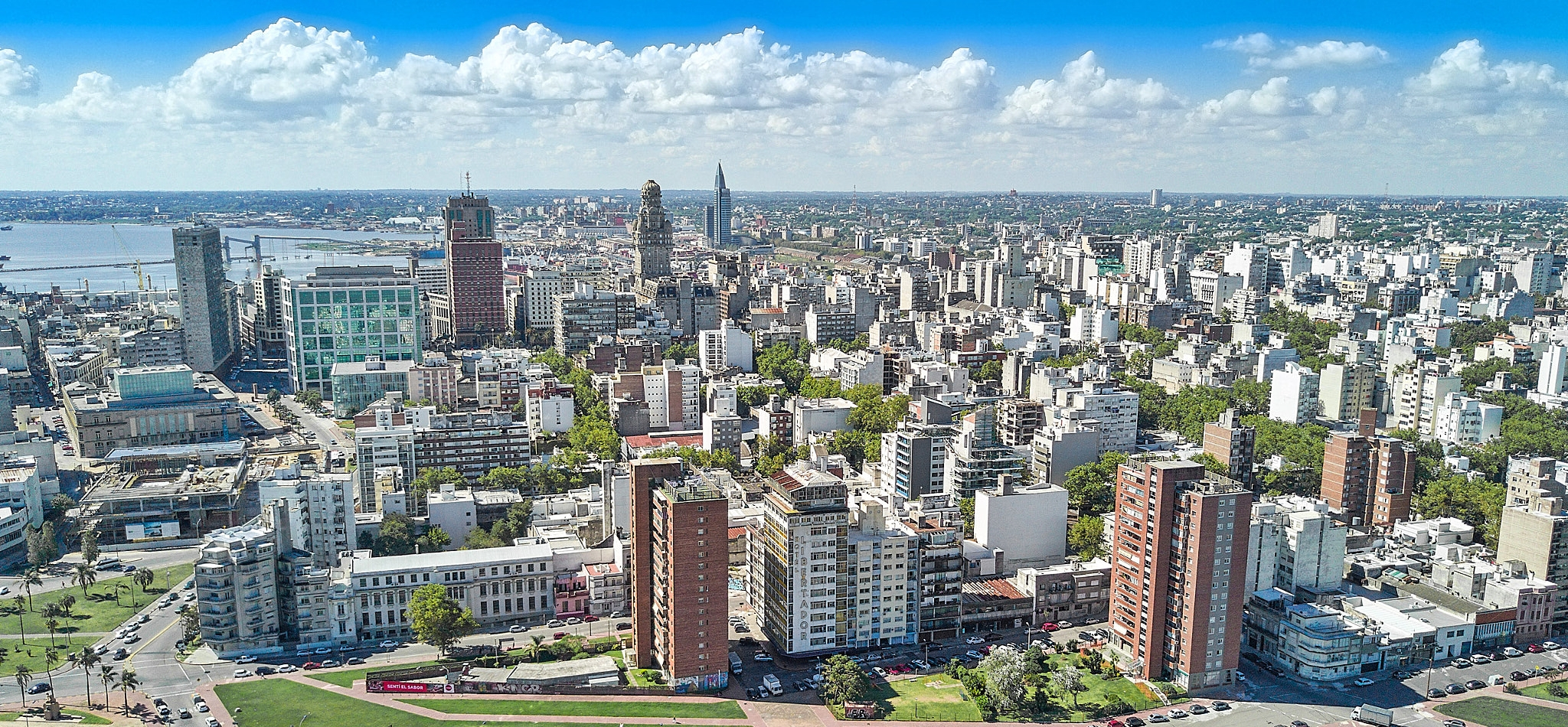
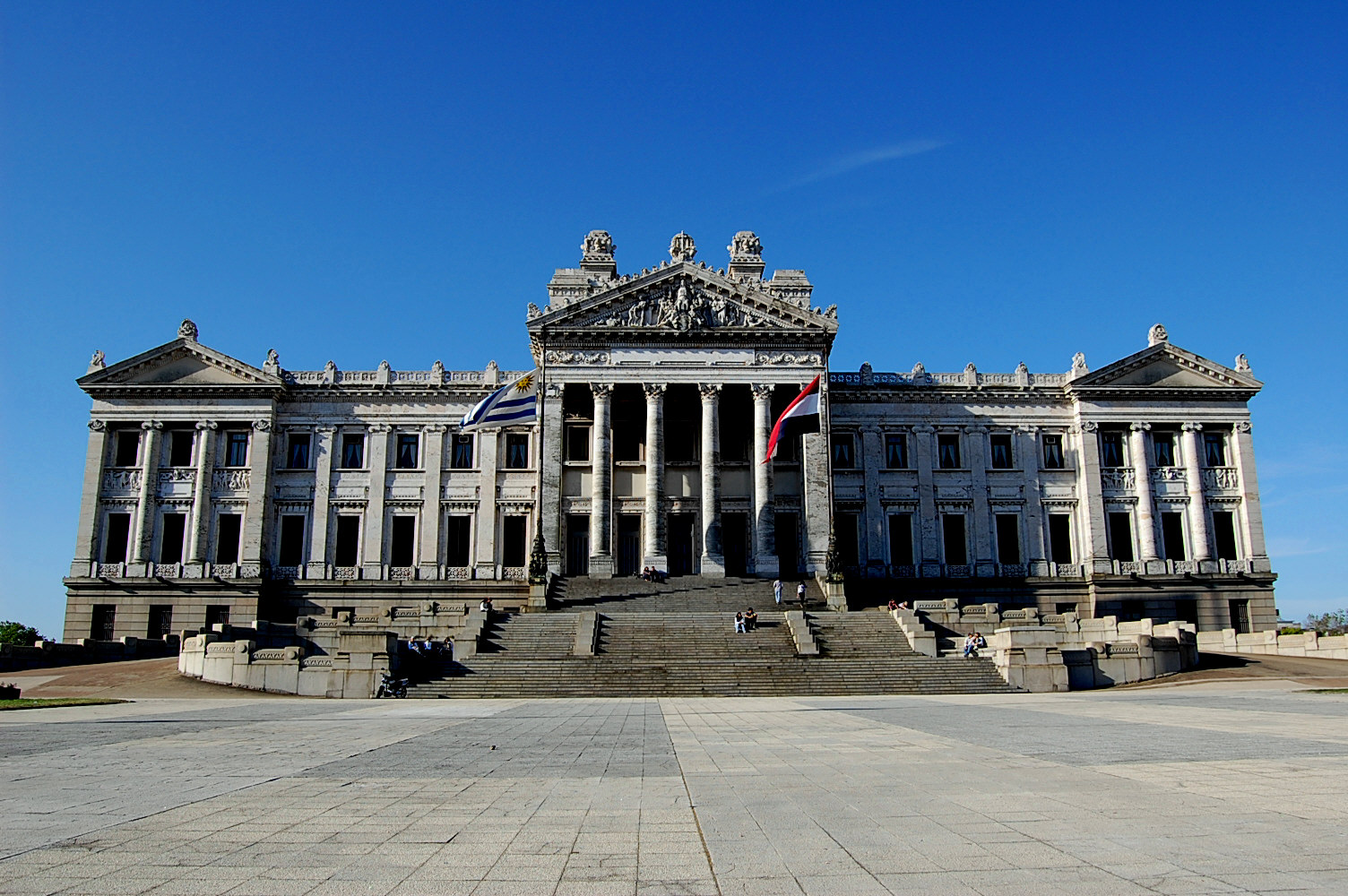
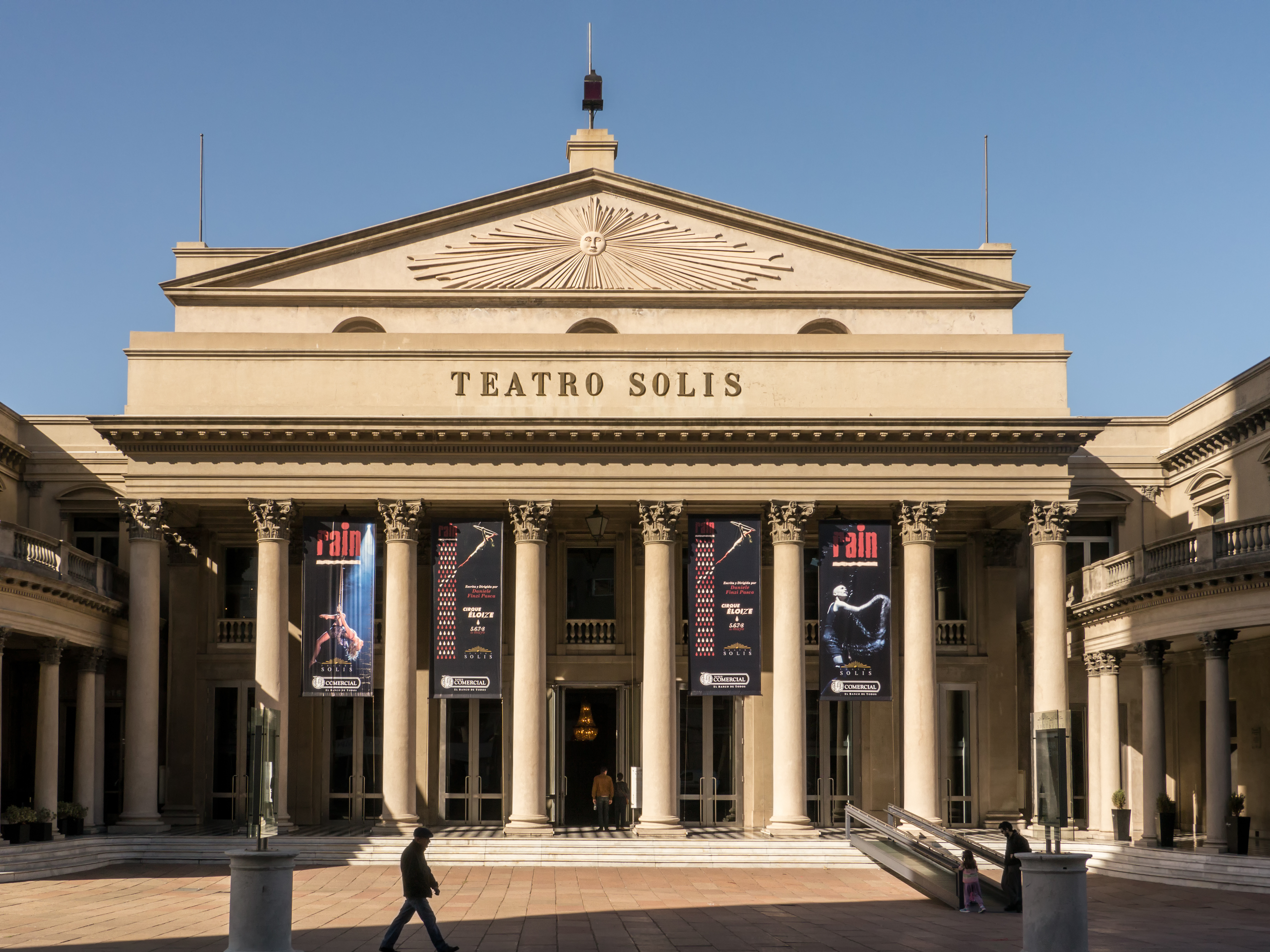
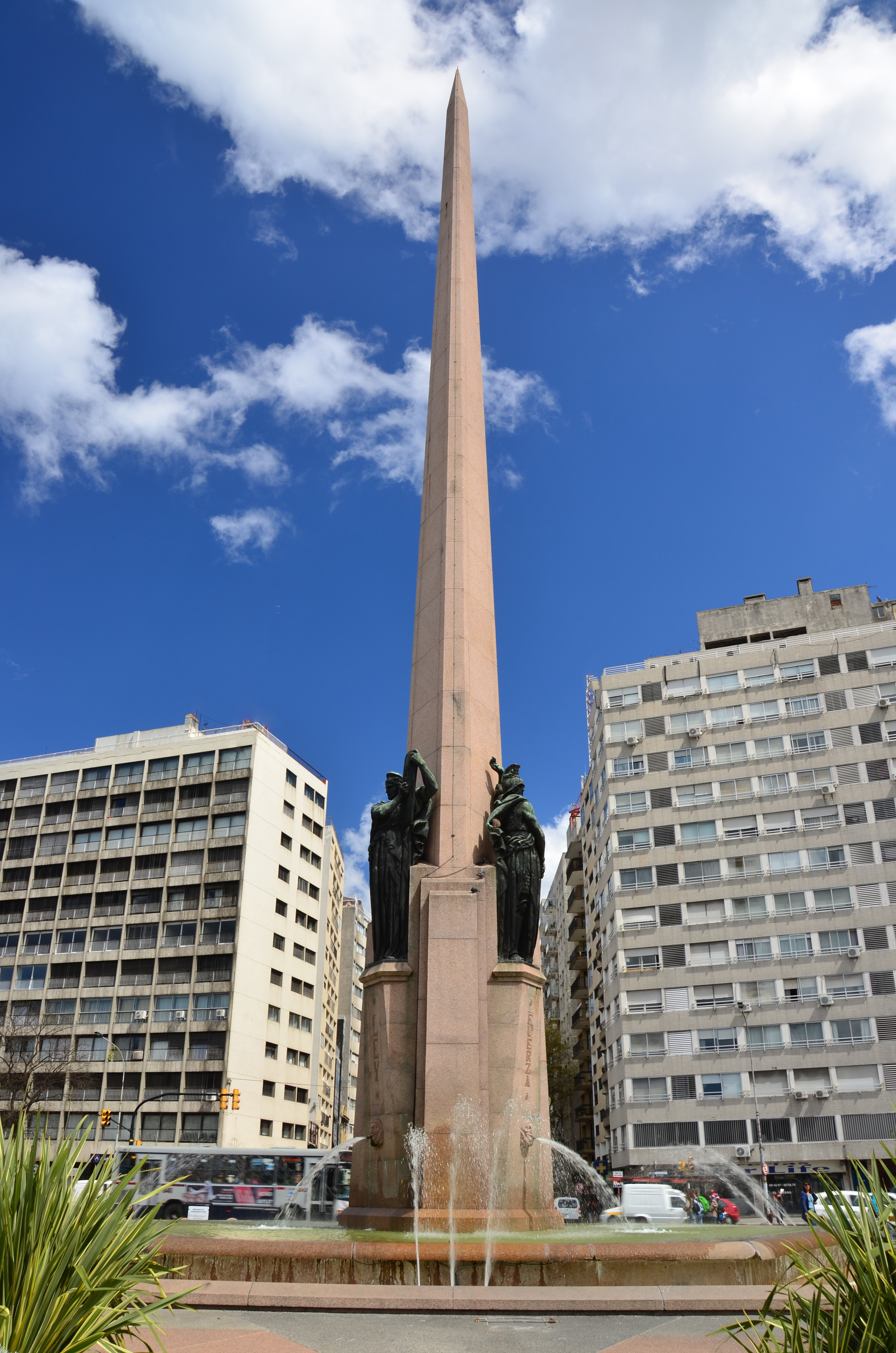
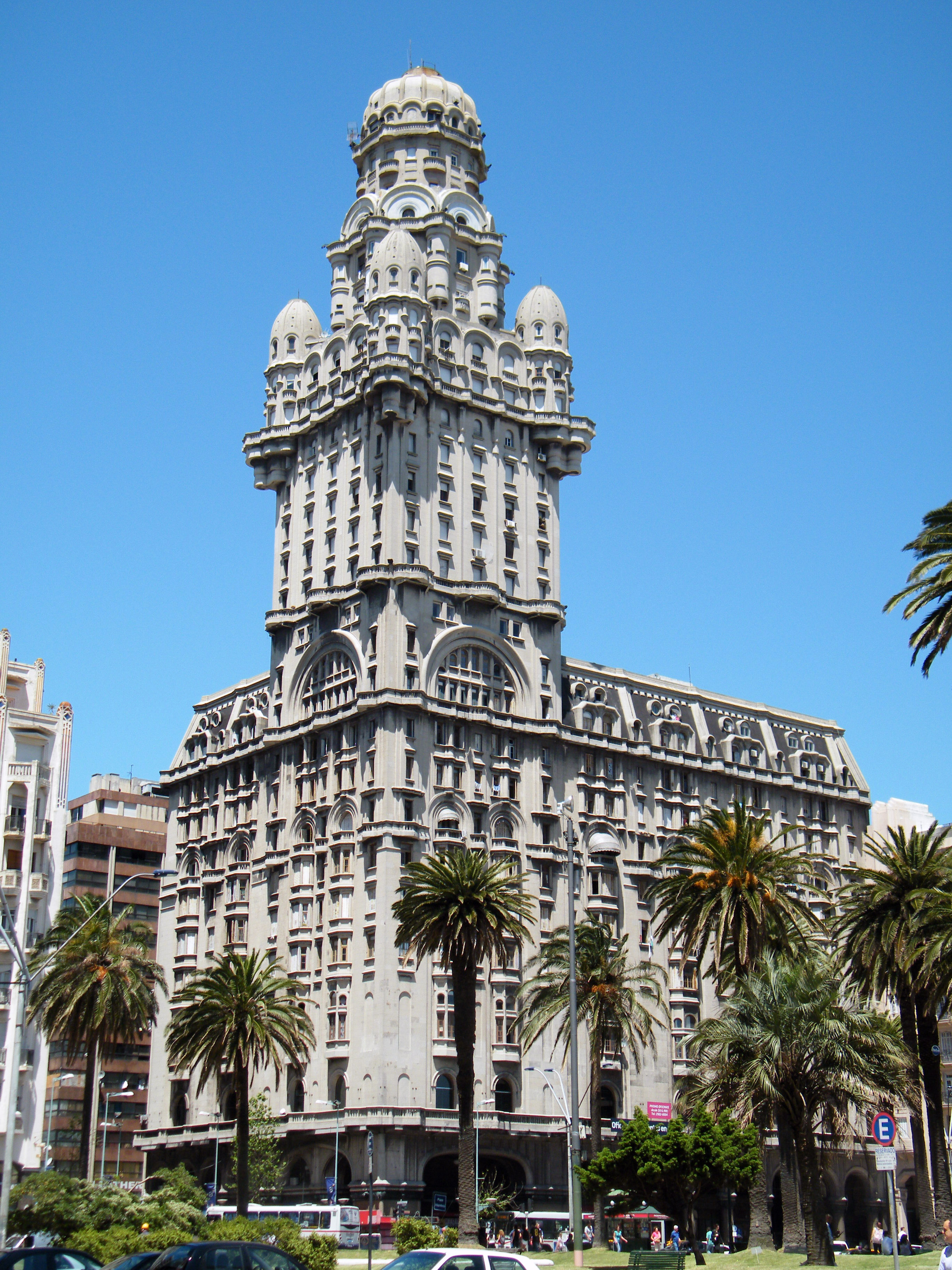
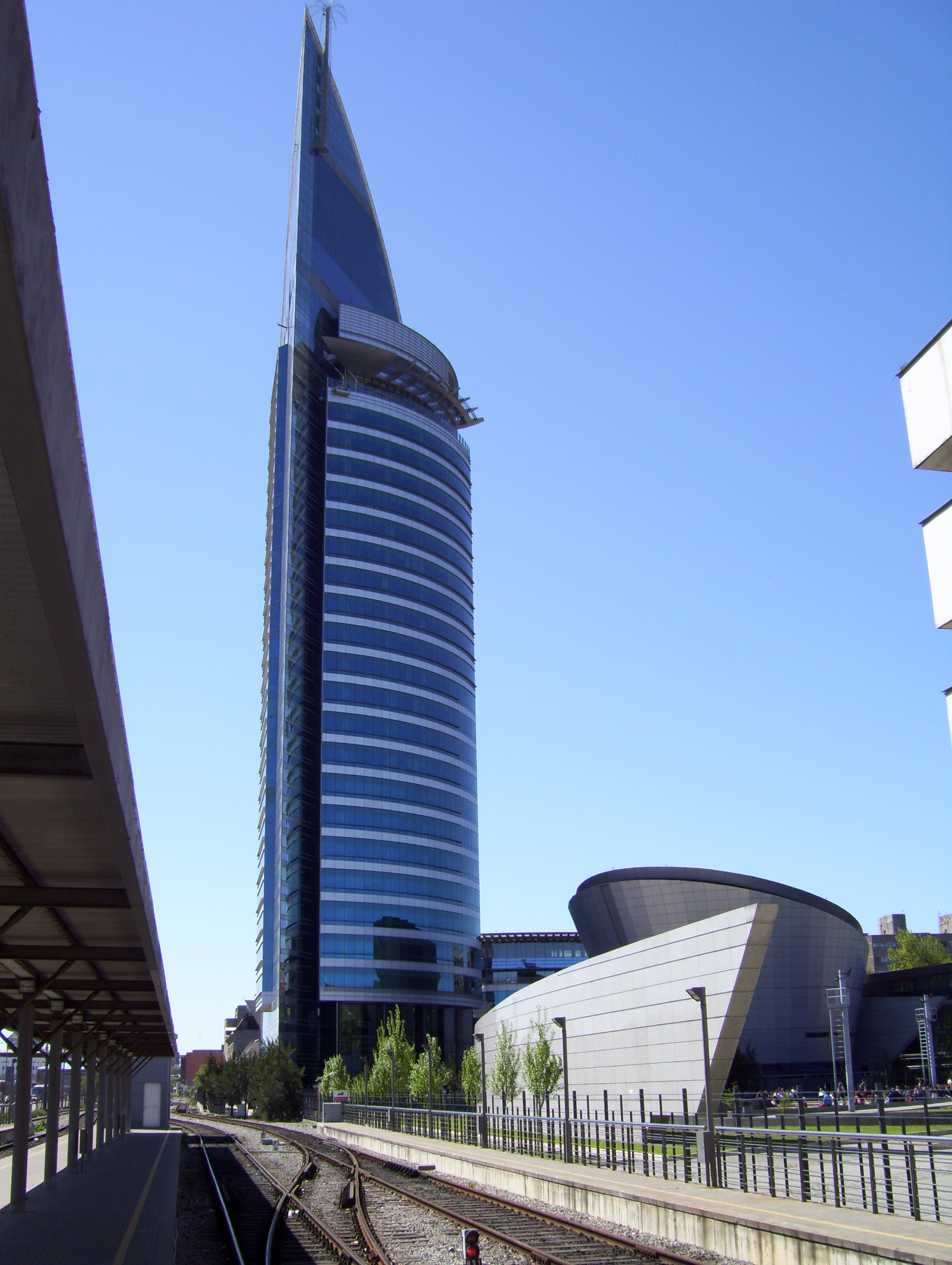
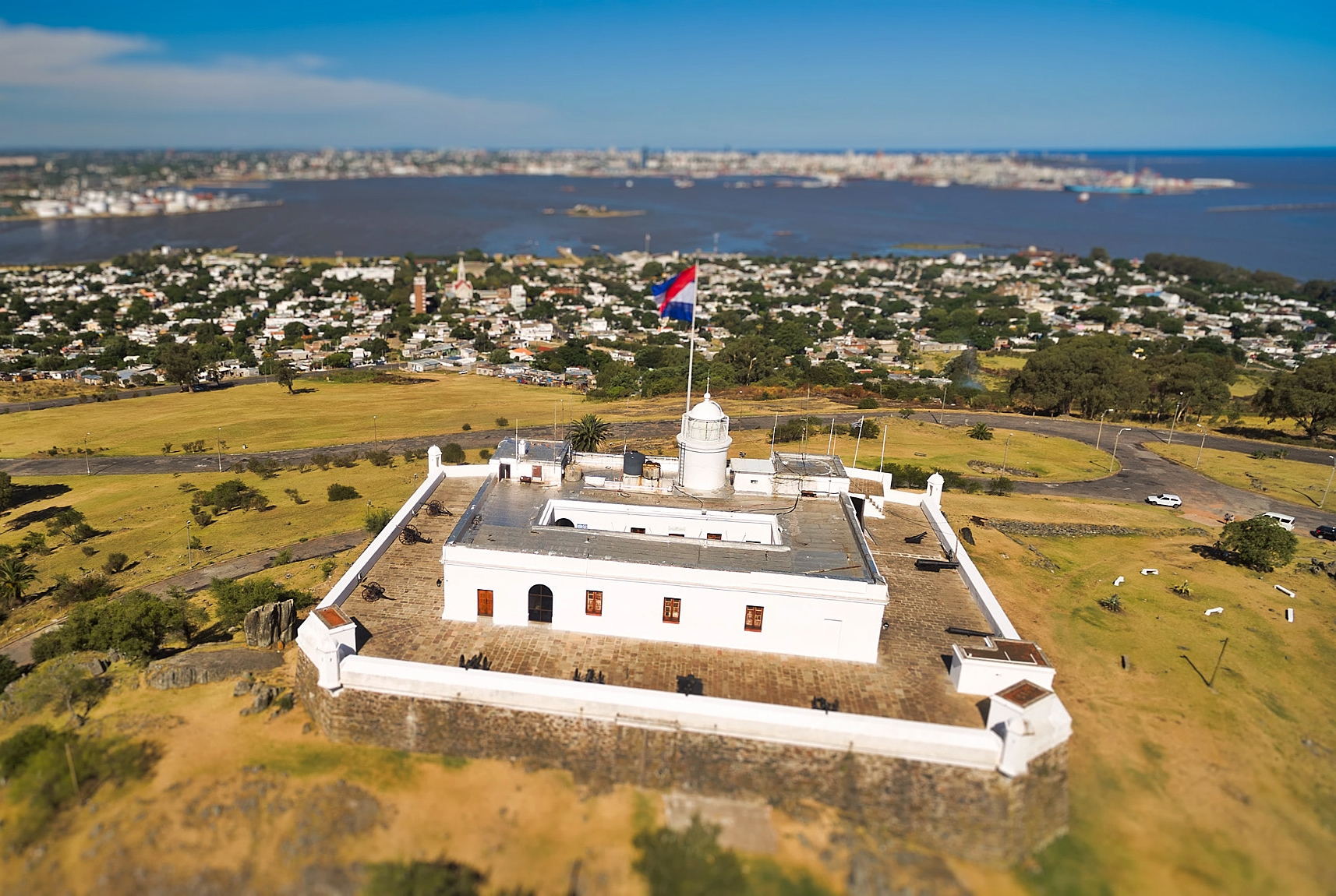
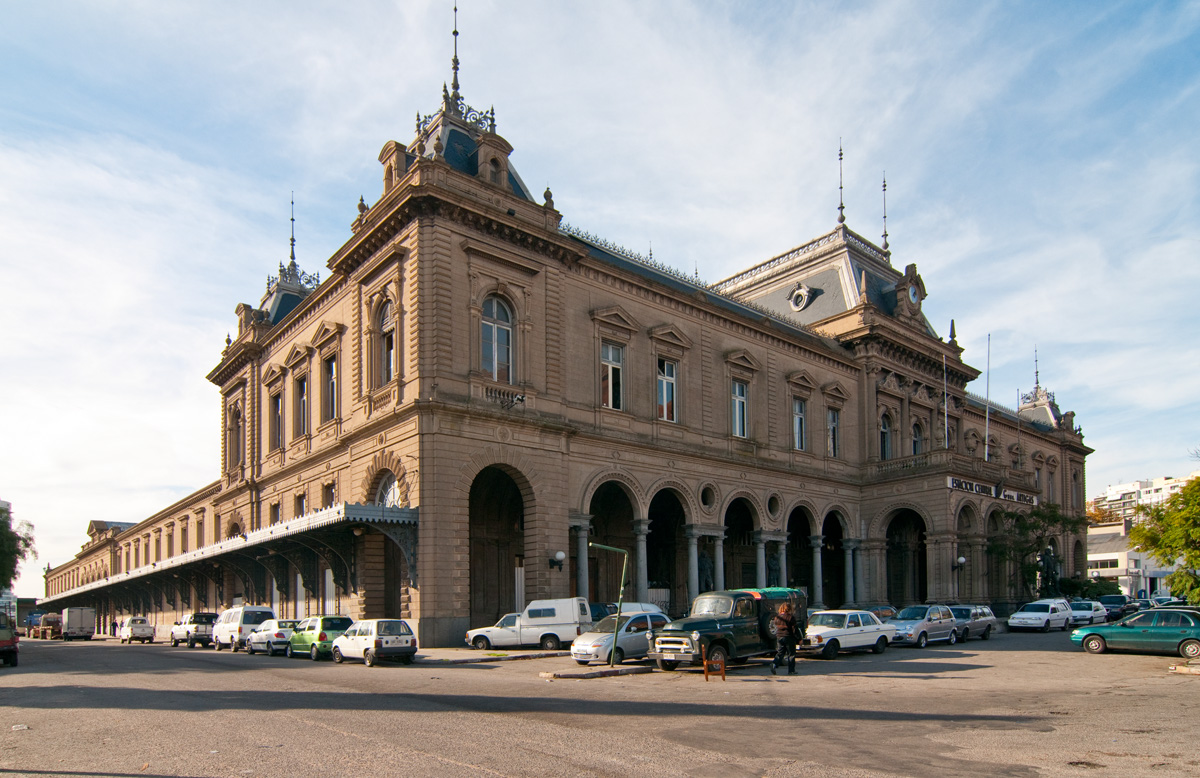
- Aerial view of Centro, Rambla and Barrio Sur Legislative Palace of Uruguay Solís Theatre Obelisk of Montevideo Palacio Salvo Antel Tower Fortaleza del Cerro General Artigas railway station

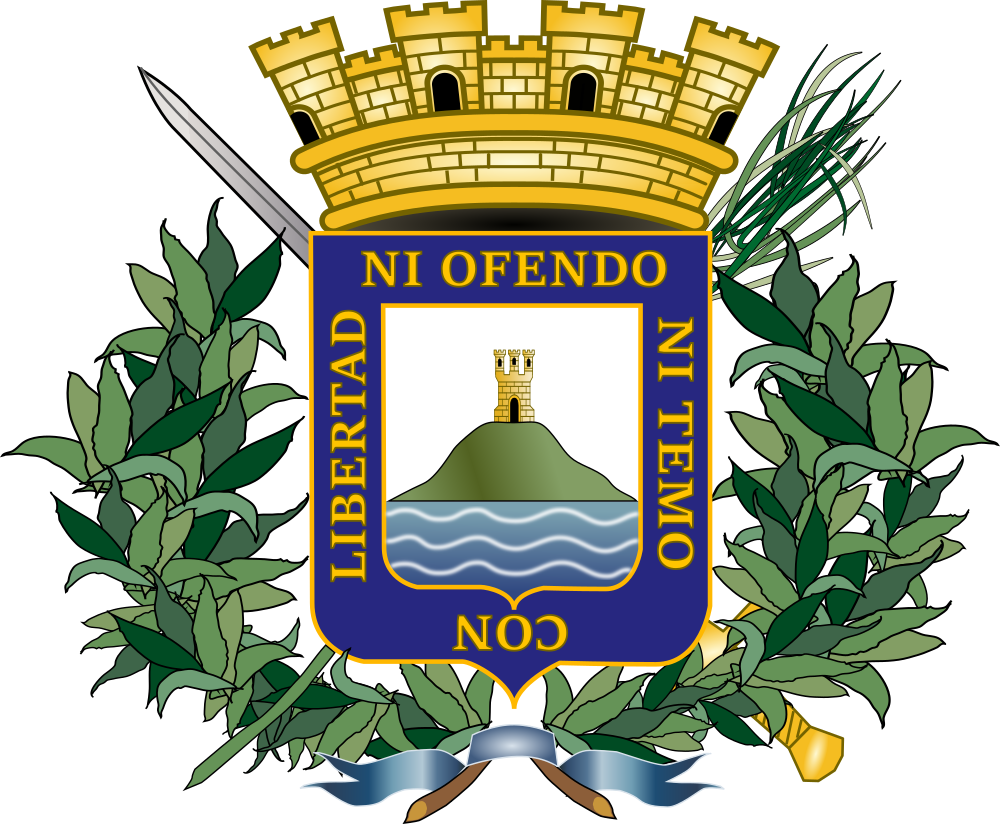
- Flag Coat of arms
- Motto(s): Con libertad ni ofendo ni temo With liberty I offend not, I fear not.
- Interactive map of Montevideo
- Location within Uruguay Location within South America
- Coordinates: 34°54′20″S 56°11′03″W
- Country: Uruguay
- Department: Montevideo
- Established: 1726; 300 years ago
- Founder: Bruno Mauricio de Zabala

Government
  - Type: Strong mayor
  - Intendant: Mario Bergara

Area
  - Capital city: 201 km^{2} (77.5 sq mi)
  - Metro: 1,640 km^{2} (633 sq mi)
- The department area is 530 square kilometers (200 sq mi) and the conurbated built-up area 350 square kilometers (140 sq mi).
- Elevation: 43 m (141 ft)

Population (2023)
  - Capital city: 1,287,452
  - Rank: 1st
  - Density: 6,400/km^{2} (17,000/sq mi)
  - Urban: 1,788,170
  - Metro: 1,947,604
  - Department: 1,319,108
- Demonyms: montevideano (m) montevideana (f) Montevidean (English)

GDP (PPP, constant 2015 values)
  - Year: 2023
  - Total: $41.7 billion
  - Per capita: $23,500
- Time zone: UTC−03:00 (UYT)
- Postal code: 11#00 & 12#00
- Dial plan: (+598) 2XXX XXXX
- Vehicle registration: S
- HDI (2017): 0.841 – very high
- Website: montevideo.gub.uy (in Spanish)

Montevideo (/ˌmɒntɪvɪˈdeɪoʊ/, US also /-ˈvɪdioʊ/; Spanish: [monteβiˈðeo]) is the capital and largest city of Uruguay. As of the 2023 census, the city proper has a population of 1,287,452, making up about 36.8% of the country's total population, in an area of 201 square kilometers (78 sq mi). Montevideo is situated on the southern coast of the country, on the northeastern bank of the Río de la Plata.

A Portuguese garrison was established at the site of modern-day Montevideo in November 1723. The Portuguese garrison was expelled in February 1724 by a Spanish soldier, Bruno Mauricio de Zabala, as a strategic move amidst the Spanish-Portuguese dispute over the platine region. There is no official document establishing the foundation of the city, but the "Diario" of Bruno Mauricio de Zabala officially mentions the date of 24 December 1726 as the foundation, corroborated by presential witnesses. The complete independence from Buenos Aires as a real city was not reached until 1 January 1730. It was also under brief British rule in 1807, but eventually the city was retaken by Spanish criollos who defeated the British invasions of the River Plate. Montevideo is the seat of the administrative headquarters of Mercosur and ALADI, Latin America's leading trade blocs, a position that has entailed comparisons to the role of Brussels in Europe.

The 2019 Mercer report on quality of life rated Montevideo first in Latin America, a rank the city has consistently held since 2005. As of 2010, Montevideo was the 19th largest city economy in the continent and 9th highest income earner among major cities. In 2022, it has a projected GDP of $53.9 billion, with a per capita of $30,148. In 2018, it was classified as a beta global city, ranking eighth in Latin America and 84th in the world. Montevideo hosted every match during the first FIFA World Cup in 1930. It has been described as a "vibrant, eclectic place with a rich cultural life", and "a thriving tech center and entrepreneurial culture".

The city features historic European architecture and is considered one of the cities with the most art deco influence. It is the hub of commerce and higher education in Uruguay as well as its chief port and financial hub, anchoring a metropolitan area with a population of around 2 million.

== Etymology ==
There are several explanations for the word Montevideo. All agree that "Monte" refers to the Cerro de Montevideo, the hill situated across the Bay of Montevideo, but there is disagreement about the etymological origin of the "video" part.

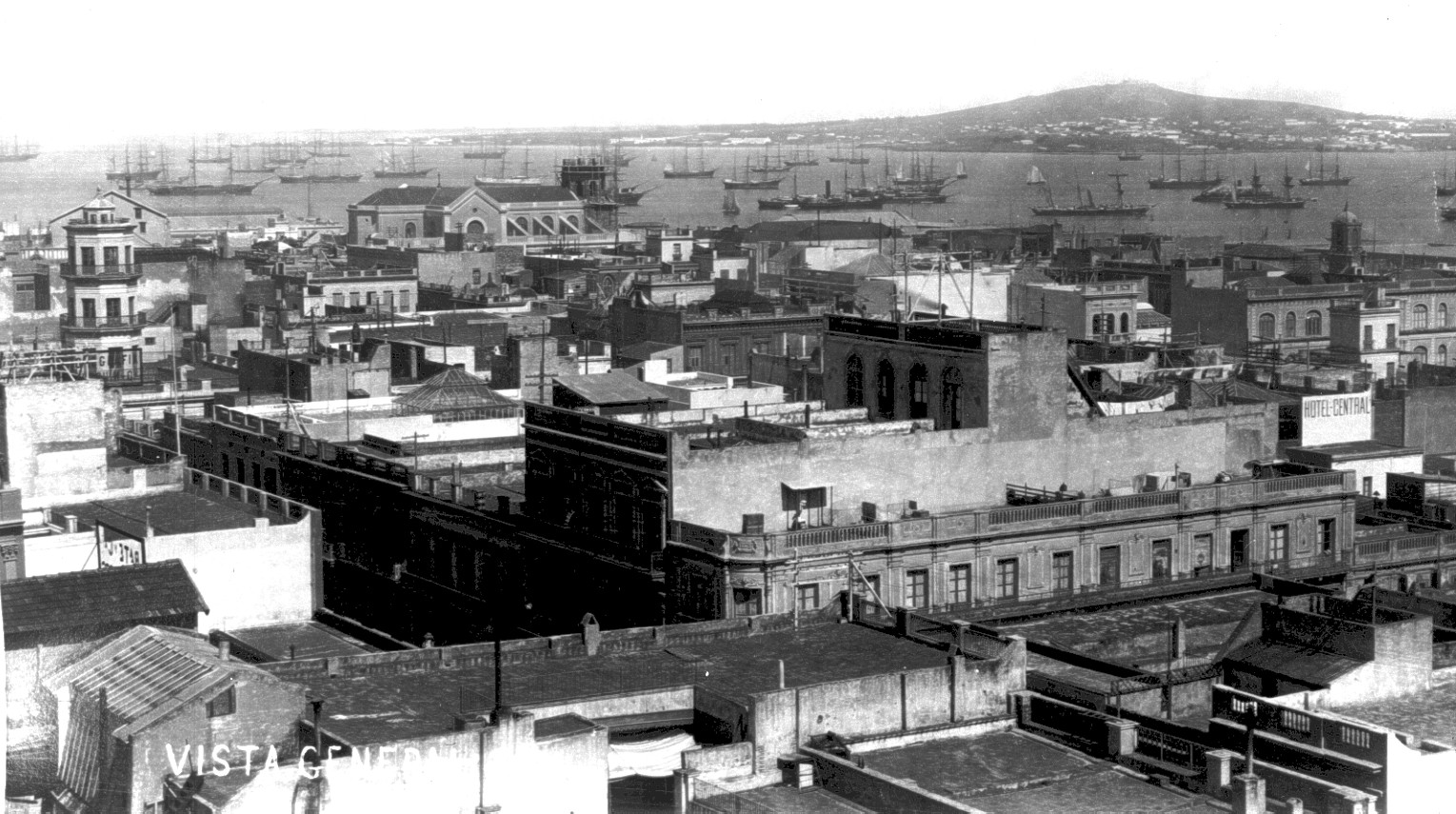
Cerro de Montevideo as seen from the city, in 1865.

- Monte vide eu ("I saw a mount") is the most widespread belief but is rejected by the majority of experts, who consider it unlikely because it involves a mix of dialects. The name would come from a Portuguese expression which means "I saw a mount", wrongly pronounced by an anonymous sailor belonging to the expedition of Ferdinand Magellan on catching sight of the Cerro de Montevideo.
- Montem vídeo ("I see a hill"): This version, a variant of the previous one, suggests that the name comes directly from Latin, stemming from the spontaneous expression of a learned member of Magellan's expedition, who, upon spotting the Cerro de Montevideo, exclaimed: Montem vídeo ("I see a hill"). The rest of the crew, who did not speak Latin, mistakenly registered this as the name of the hill they had just sighted, Monte Vídeo. This theory is supported by numerous maps and documents from the colonial period that refer to the Cerro de Montevideo with the name Monte Vídeo.
- Monte Vidi: This hypothesis comes from the "Diario de Navegación" (Navigational Calendar) of boatswain Francisco de Albo, member of the expedition of Magellan, who wrote, "Tuesday of the said [month of January 1520] we were on the straits of Cape Santa María [now Punta del Este], from where the coast runs east to west, and the terrain is sandy, and at the right of the cape there is a mountain like a hat to which we gave the name "Montevidi"." This is the oldest Spanish document that mentions the promontory with a name similar to the one that designates the city, but it does not contain any mention of the alleged cry "Monte vide eu."
- Monte-VI-D-E-O (Monte VI De Este a Oeste, "Sixth mount from east to west"): According to Rolando Laguarda Trías, professor of history, the Spaniards annotated the geographic location on a map or Portolan chart, so that the mount/hill is the VI (6th) mount observable on the coast, navigating Río de la Plata from east to west. With the passing of time, these words were unified to "Montevideo". No conclusive evidence has been found to confirm this academic hypothesis, nor can it be asserted with certainty which the other five mounts observable before the Cerro were.
- Monte Ovídio (Monte Santo Ovídio), a less widespread hypothesis of a religious origin, stems from an interpolation in the aforementioned Diario de Navegación of Francisco de Albo, where it is asserted "corruptly now called Santo Vidio" when they refer to the hat-like mount which they named Monte Vidi (that is, the Cerro de Montevideo). Auditus of Braga (Spanish: Ovídio) was the third bishop of the Roman city of Braga (now in Portugal) in 95 CE, where he was always revered; a monument to him was erected there in 1505. Given the relationship that the Portuguese had with the discovery and foundation of Montevideo, and despite the fact that this hypothesis, like the previous ones, lacks conclusive documentation, there have been those who linked the name of Santo Ovídio or Vídio (appearing on some maps of the time) with the subsequent derivation of the name "Montevideo" given to the region since the early years of the 16th century.

When the Portuguese invaded the Banda Oriental and annexed it as the province of Cisplatina until 1831, they called the city Montevidéu, and pronounced as [mõtɨviˈðew].

== History ==
Historical Affiliations

- Spanish Empire 1724–1807
- British Empire 1807
- Spanish Empire 1807–1814
- Río de la Plata 1814–1815
- Federal League 1815–1817
- U.K. of Portugal, Brazil and the Algarves 1817–1822
- Empire of Brazil 1822–1828
- Uruguay 1828–present

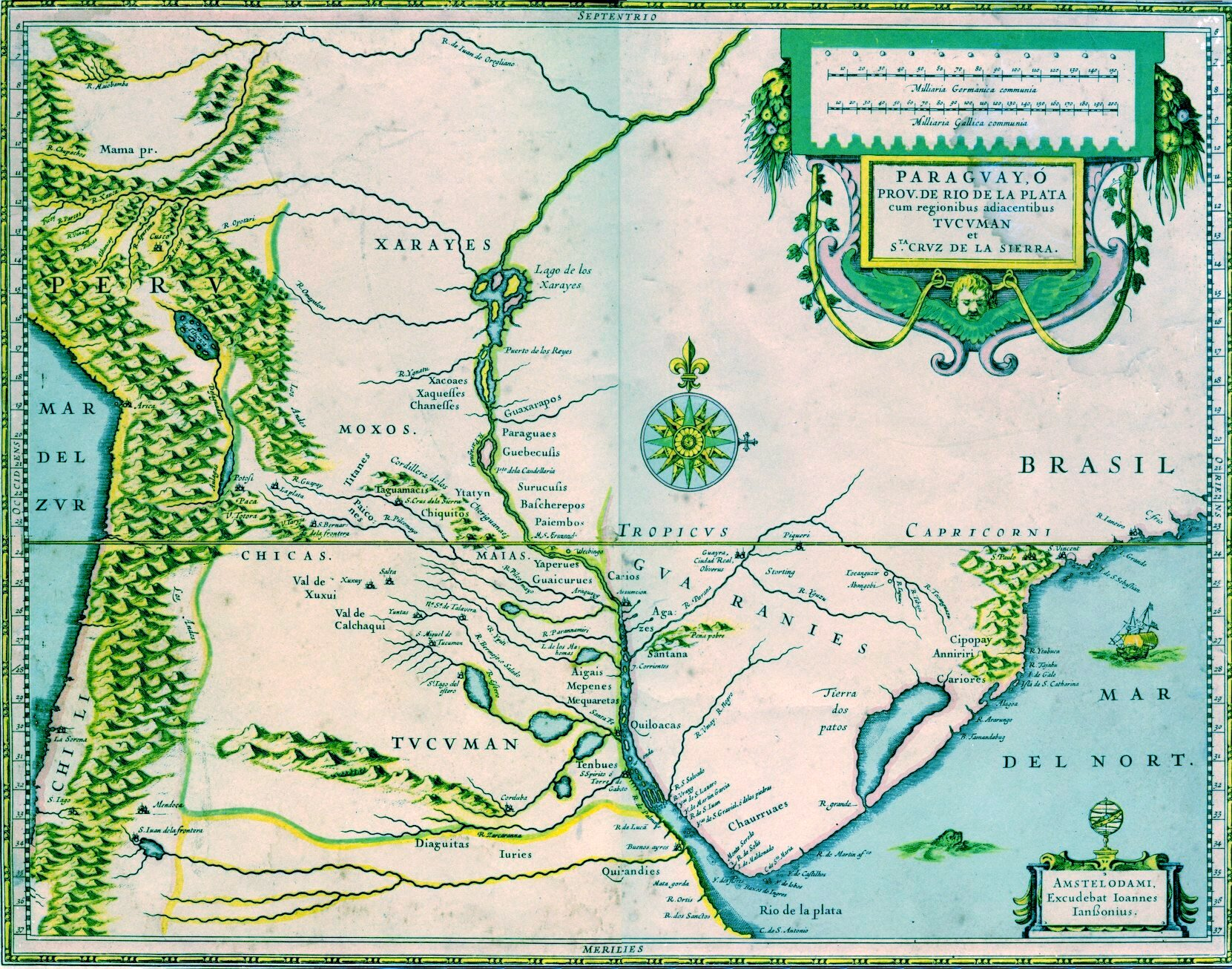
17th century map of the Río de la Plata basin

=== Early history ===
Between 1680 and 1683, Portugal founded the city of Colonia do Sacramento in the region across the bay from Buenos Aires. This city met with no resistance from the Spanish until 1723, when they began to place fortifications on the elevations around Montevideo Bay. On 22 November 1723, Field Marshal Manuel de Freitas da Fonseca of Portugal built the Montevieu fort.

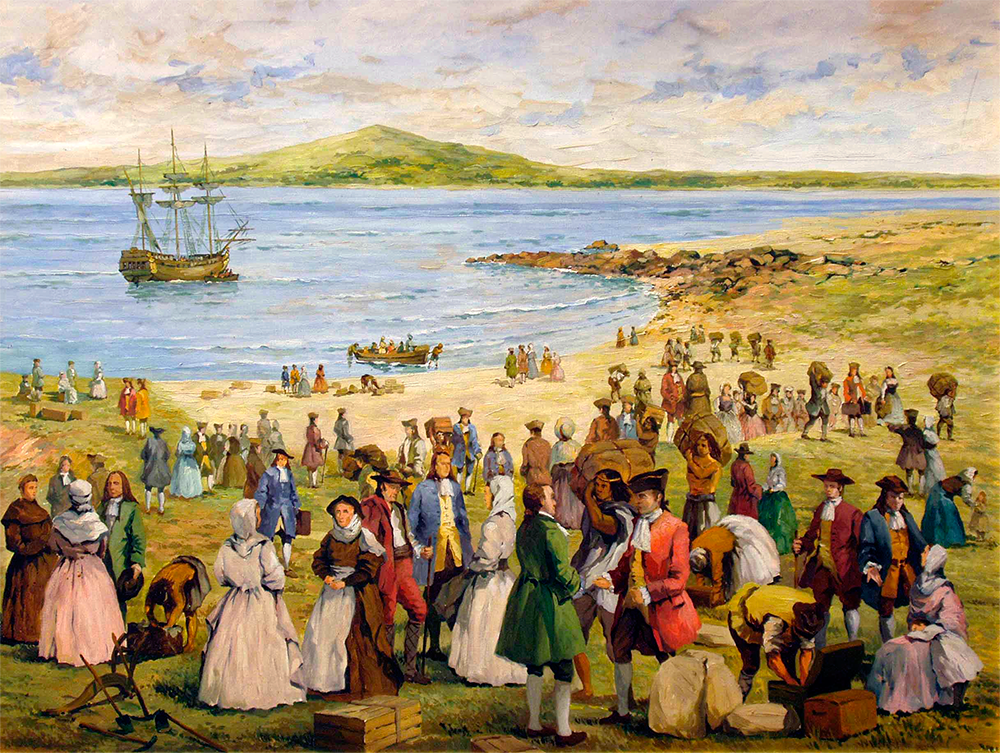
Arrival of the first families from the Canary Islands in 1726.

A Spanish expedition was sent from Buenos Aires, organized by the Spanish governor of that city, Bruno Mauricio de Zabala. On 22 January 1724, the Spanish forced the Portuguese to abandon the location and started populating the city, initially with six families moving in from Buenos Aires and soon thereafter by families arriving from the Canary Islands who were known as Guanches or Canarians. There was also one significant early Italian resident by the name of Jorge Burgues.

A census of the city's inhabitants was performed in 1724 and then a plan was drawn delineating the city and designating it as San Felipe y Santiago de Montevideo, later shortened to Montevideo. The census counted more than 100 families of Galician and Canary Islands origin, more than 1000 indigenous people, mostly Guaraní, as well as some trafficked slaves of Bantu origin.

A few years after its foundation, Montevideo became the main city of the region north of the Río de la Plata and east of the Uruguay River, competing with Buenos Aires for dominance in maritime commerce. The importance of Montevideo as the main port of the Viceroyalty of the Río de la Plata brought it in confrontations with the city of Buenos Aires in various occasions, including several times when it was taken over to be used as a base to defend the eastern province of the Viceroyalty from Portuguese incursions.

In 1776, Spain made Montevideo its main naval base (Real Apostadero de Marina) for the South Atlantic, with authority over the Argentine coast, Fernando Po, and the Falklands. Until the end of the 18th century, Montevideo remained a fortified area, today known as Ciudad Vieja.

=== 19th century ===
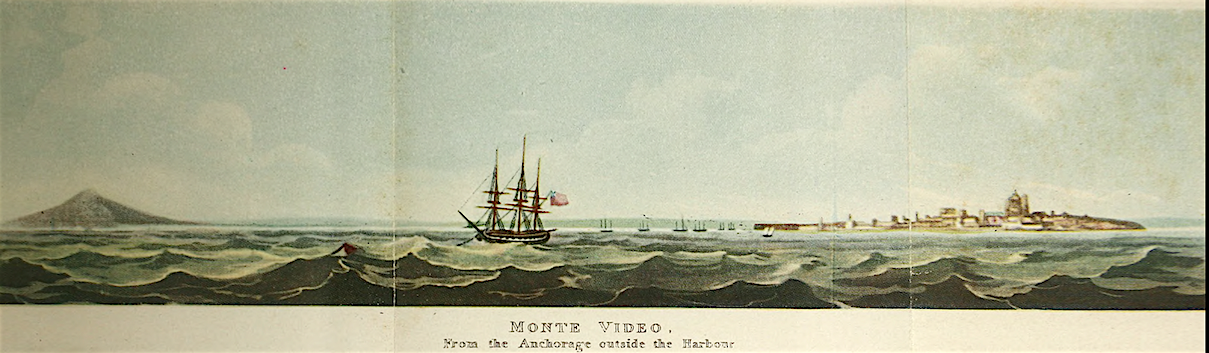
"Monte Video from the Anchorage outside the Harbour" by Emeric Essex Vidal (1820). The earliest securely dated picture of the city.

On 3 February 1807, British troops under the command of General Samuel Auchmuty and Admiral Charles Stirling occupied the city during the Battle of Montevideo (1807), but it was recaptured by the Spanish in the same year on 2 September when John Whitelocke was forced to surrender to troops formed by forces of the Banda Oriental—roughly the same area as modern Uruguay—and of Buenos Aires. After this conflict, the governor of Montevideo Francisco Javier de Elío opposed the new viceroy Santiago de Liniers, and created a government Junta when the Peninsular War started in Spain, in defiance of Liniers. Elío disestablished the Junta when Liniers was replaced by Baltasar Hidalgo de Cisneros.

During the May Revolution of 1810 and the subsequent uprising of the provinces of Rio de la Plata, the Spanish colonial government moved to Montevideo. During that year and the next, Uruguayan revolutionary José Gervasio Artigas united with others from Buenos Aires against Spain. In 1811, the forces deployed by the Junta Grande of Buenos Aires and the gaucho forces led by Artigas started a siege of Montevideo, which had refused to obey the directives of the new authorities of the May Revolution. The siege was lifted at the end of that year, when the military situation started deteriorating in the Upper Peru region.

The Spanish governor was expelled in 1814. In 1816, Portugal invaded the recently liberated territory and in 1821, it was annexed to the Banda Oriental of Brazil. It was named Imperial City by Emperor Pedro I when the city was part of the Empire of Brazil as the capital of the Cisplatina province. Juan Antonio Lavalleja and his band called the Treinta y Tres Orientales ("Thirty-Three Orientals") re-established the independence of the region in 1825. Uruguay was consolidated as an independent state in 1828, with Montevideo as the nation's capital. In 1829, the demolition of the city's fortifications began and plans were made for an extension beyond the Ciudad Vieja, referred to as the "Ciudad Nueva" ("new city"). Urban expansion, however, moved very slowly because of the events that followed.

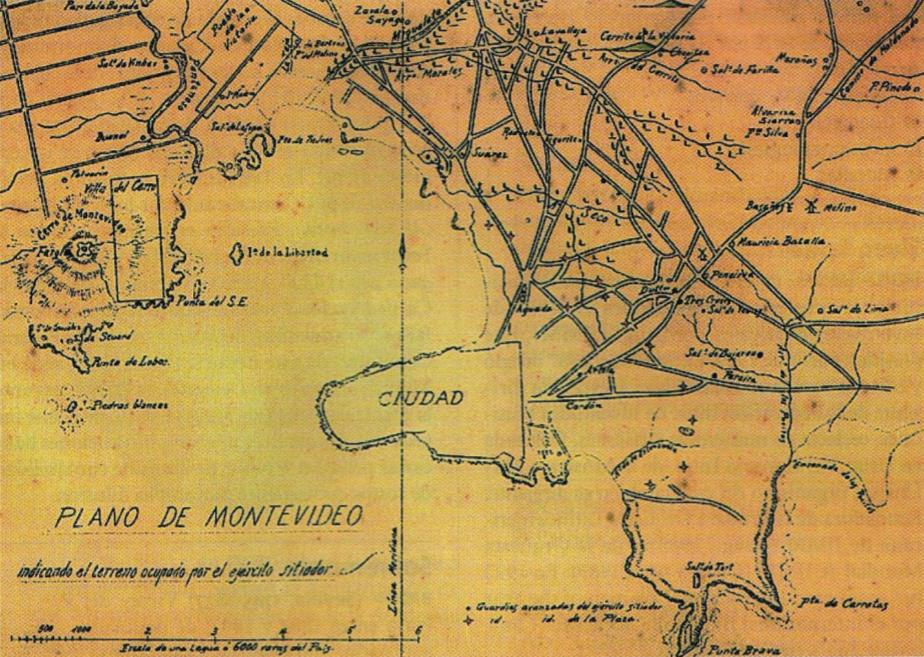
Map of Montevideo during the Guerra Grande (1843–1851).

Uruguay's 1830s were dominated by the confrontation between Manuel Oribe and Fructuoso Rivera, the two revolutionary leaders who had fought against the Empire of Brazil under the command of Lavalleja, each of whom had become the caudillo of their respective faction. Politics were divided between Oribe's Blancos ("whites"), represented by the National Party, and Rivera's Colorados ("reds"), represented by the Colorado Party, with each party's name taken from the color of its emblems. In 1838, Oribe was forced to resign from the presidency; he established a rebel army and began a long civil war, the Guerra Grande, which lasted until 1851.

The city of Montevideo suffered a siege of eight years between 1843 and 1851, during which it was supplied by sea with British and French support. By 1843 Montevideo's population of thirty thousand inhabitants was highly cosmopolitan with Uruguayans making up only a third of it. The remaining were chiefly Italian (4205), Spanish (3406), Argentine (2553), Portuguese (659), English (606) and Brazilians (492). Oribe, with the support of the then conservative Governor of Buenos Aires Province Juan Manuel de Rosas, besieged the Colorados in Montevideo, where the latter were supported by the French Legion, the Italian Legion, the Basque Legion and battalions from Brazil. Finally in 1851, with the additional support of Argentine rebels who opposed Rosas, the Colorados defeated Oribe. The fighting however resumed in 1855, when the Blancos came to power, which they maintained until 1865. Thereafter, the Colorado Party regained power, which they retained until the middle of the 20th century.

After the end of hostilities, a period of growth and expansion started for the city. In 1853 a stagecoach bus line was established joining Montevideo with the newly formed settlement of Unión and the first natural gas street lights were inaugurated. From 1854 to 1861 the first public sanitation facilities were constructed. In 1856 the Teatro Solís was inaugurated, 15 years after the beginning of its construction. By Decree, in December 1861 the areas of Aguada and Cordón were incorporated to the growing Ciudad Nueva (New City). In 1866, an underwater telegraph line connected the city with Buenos Aires. The statue of Peace, La Paz, was erected on a column in Plaza Cagancha and the building of the Postal Service as well as the bridge of Paso Molino were inaugurated in 1867.

In 1868, the horse-drawn tram company Compañía de Tranvías al Paso del Molino y Cerro created the first lines connecting Montevideo with Unión, the beach resort of Capurro and the industrialized and economically independent Villa del Cerro, at the time called Cosmopolis. In the same year, the Mercado del Puerto was inaugurated. In 1869, the first railway line of the company Ferrocarril Central del Uruguay was inaugurated connecting Bella Vista with the town of Las Piedras. During the same year and the next, the neighborhoods Colón, Nuevo París and La Comercial were founded. The Sunday market of Tristán Narvaja Street was established in Cordón in 1870. Public water supply was established in 1871. In 1878, Bulevar Circunvalación was constructed, a boulevard starting from Punta Carretas, going up to the north end of the city and then turning west to end at the beach of Capurro. It was renamed Artigas Boulevard in 1885. By Decree, on 8 January 1881, the area Los Pocitos was incorporated into the Novísima Ciudad (Most New City).

The first telephone lines were installed in 1882 and electric street lights took the place of the gas-operated ones in 1886. The Hipódromo de Maroñas started operating in 1888, and the neighborhoods of Reus del Sur, Reus del Norte and Conciliación were inaugurated in 1889. The new building of the School of Arts and Trades, as well as Zabala Square in Ciudad Vieja were inaugurated in 1890, followed by the Italian Hospital in 1891. In the same year, the village of Peñarol was founded. Other neighborhoods that were founded were Belgrano and Belvedere in 1892, Jacinto Vera in 1895 and Trouville in 1897. In 1894 the new port was constructed, and in 1897, the Central Railway Station of Montevideo was inaugurated.

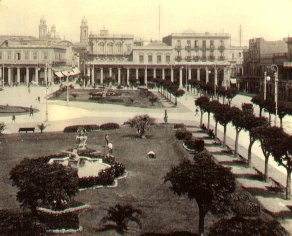
Plaza Independencia around 1900.

=== 20th century ===
In the early 20th century, many Europeans (particularly Spaniards and Italians but also thousands from Central Europe) immigrated to the city. In 1908, 30% of the city's population of 300,000 was foreign-born. In that decade the city expanded quickly: new neighborhoods were created and many separate settlements were annexed to the city, among which were the Villa del Cerro, Pocitos, the Prado and Villa Colón. The Rodó Park and the Estadio Gran Parque Central were also established, which served as poles of urban development. During the early 20th century, Uruguay saw huge social changes with repercussions primarily in urban areas. Among these changes were the right to divorce (1907) and women's right to vote. The 1910s saw the construction of Montevideo's Rambla; strikes by tram workers, bakers and port workers; the inauguration of electric trams; the creation of the Municipal Intendencias; and the inauguration of the new port. In 1913, the city limits were extended around the entire gulf. The previously independent localities of the Villa del Cerro and La Teja were annexed to Montevideo, becoming two of its neighborhoods. During the 1920s, the equestrian statue of Artigas was installed in Plaza Independencia; the Palacio Legislativo was built; the Spanish Plus Ultra flying boat arrived (the first airplane to fly from Spain to Latin America, 1926); prominent politician and former president José Batlle y Ordóñez died (1929); and the ground was broken (1929) for the Estadio Centenario (completed 1930).

=== World War II ===
During World War II, a famous incident involving the German cruiser Admiral Graf Spee took place in Punta del Este, 200 kilometers (120 mi) from Montevideo. After the Battle of the River Plate with the Royal Navy and Royal New Zealand Navy on 13 December 1939, the Graf Spee retreated to Montevideo's port, which was considered neutral at the time. To avoid risking the crew in what he thought would be a losing battle, Captain Hans Langsdorff scuttled the ship on 17 December. Langsdorff committed suicide two days later. The eagle figurehead of the Graf Spee was salvaged on 10 February 2006.

=== Post-war era ===
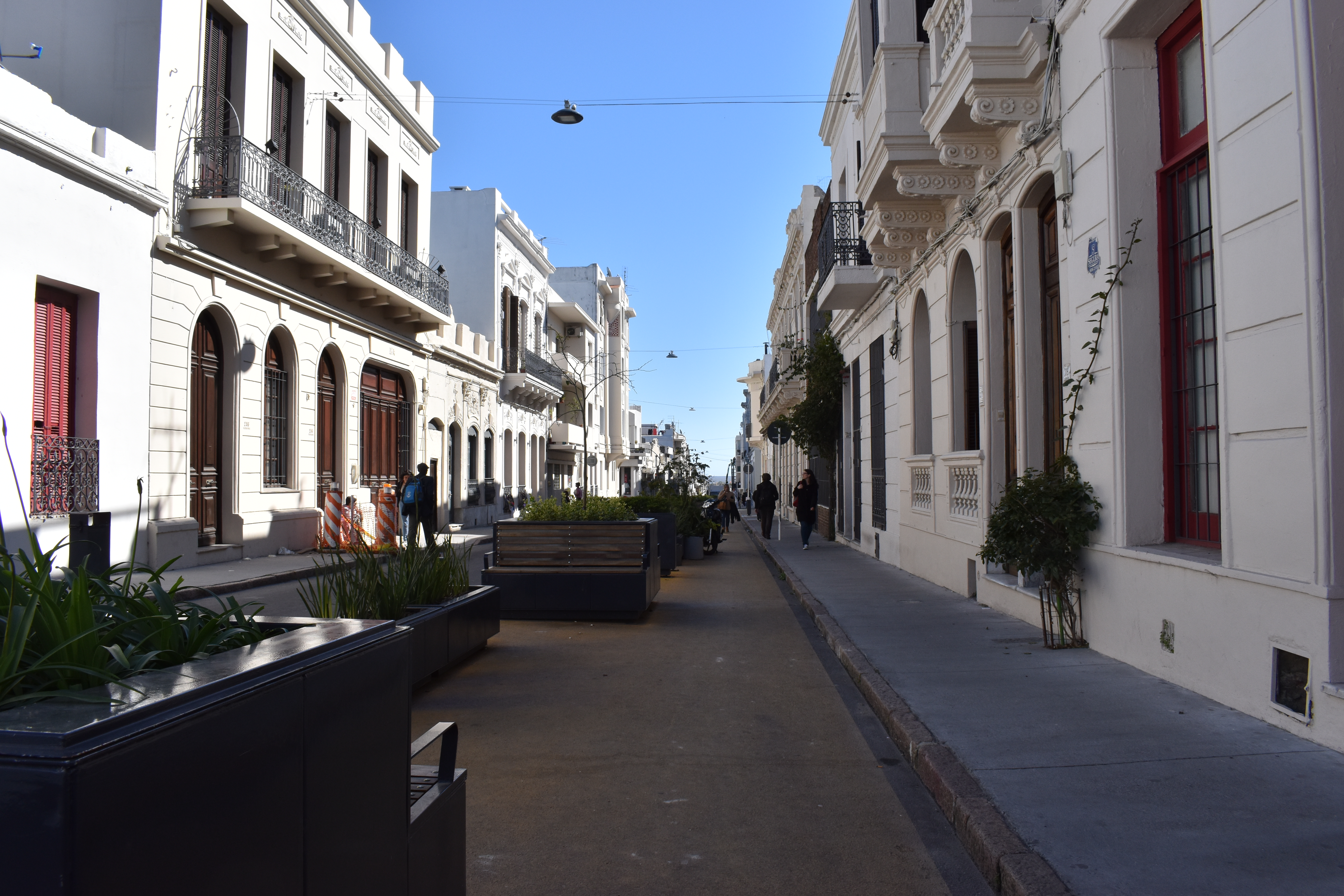
A street in Montevideo's Ciudad Vieja.

Uruguay began to stagnate economically in the mid-1950s; Montevideo began a decline, later exacerbated by widespread social and political violence beginning in 1968 (including the emergence of the guerrilla Movimiento de Liberación Nacional-Tupamaros) and by the Civic-military dictatorship of Uruguay (1973-1985). There were major problems with supply; the immigration cycle was reversed.

From the 1960s to the end of the dictatorship in 1985, around one hundred people died or disappeared because of political violence. In 1974 another hundred Uruguayans also disappeared in Argentina. In 1980, the dictatorship proposed a new constitution. The project was submitted to a referendum and rejected in the first polls since 1971, with 58% of the votes against and 42% in favor. The result weakened the military and triggered its fall, allowing the return of democracy.

In the 1980s, Pope John Paul II visited the city twice. In April 1987, as head of state of Vatican, he signed a mediation agreement for the conflict of the Beagle Channel. He also held a large mass in Tres Cruces, declaring the cross located behind the altar as a monument. In 1988, he returned to the country, visiting Montevideo, Florida, Salto and Melo.

=== 21st century ===
The 2002 Uruguay banking crisis affected several industries of Montevideo. In 2017, the city has maintained 15 years of economic growth, with a GDP of $44 billion, and a GDP per capita of $25,900.

Montevideo has consistently been rated as having the highest quality of life of any city in Latin America: by 2015 it held this rank every year during the decade through 2014.

== Geography ==
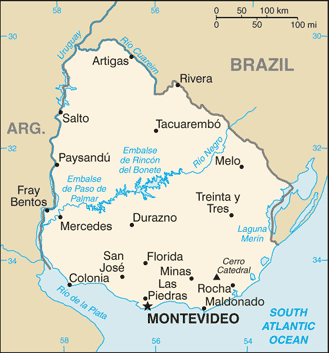
Map of Uruguay showing Montevideo on the Atlantic Ocean, between Argentina and Brazil

Montevideo is situated on the north shore of the Río de la Plata, the arm of the Atlantic Ocean that separates the south coast of Uruguay from the north coast of Argentina; Buenos Aires lies 230 kilometers (140 mi) west on the Argentine side. The Santa Lucía River forms a natural border between Montevideo and San José Department to its west. To the city's north and east is Canelones Department, with the stream of Carrasco forming the eastern natural border. The coastline forming the city's southern border is interspersed with rocky protrusions and sandy beaches. The Bay of Montevideo forms a natural harbor, the nation's largest and one of the largest in the Southern Cone, and the finest natural port in the region, functioning as a crucial component of the Uruguayan economy and foreign trade. Various streams crisscross the town and empty into the Bay of Montevideo. Its coastline near the emptying rivers are heavily polluted.

The city has an average elevation of 43 meters (141 ft). Its highest elevations are two hills: the Cerro de Montevideo and the Cerro de la Victoria, with the highest point, the peak of Cerro de Montevideo, crowned by a fortress, the Fortaleza del Cerro at a height of 134 m (440 ft). Closest cities by road are Las Piedras to the north and the so-called Ciudad de la Costa (a conglomeration of coastal towns) to the east, both in the range of 20 to 25 km (16 mi) from the city center. The approximate distances to the neighboring department capitals by road are, 90 km (56 mi) to San Jose de Mayo (San Jose Department) and 46 km (29 mi) to Canelones (Canelones Department).

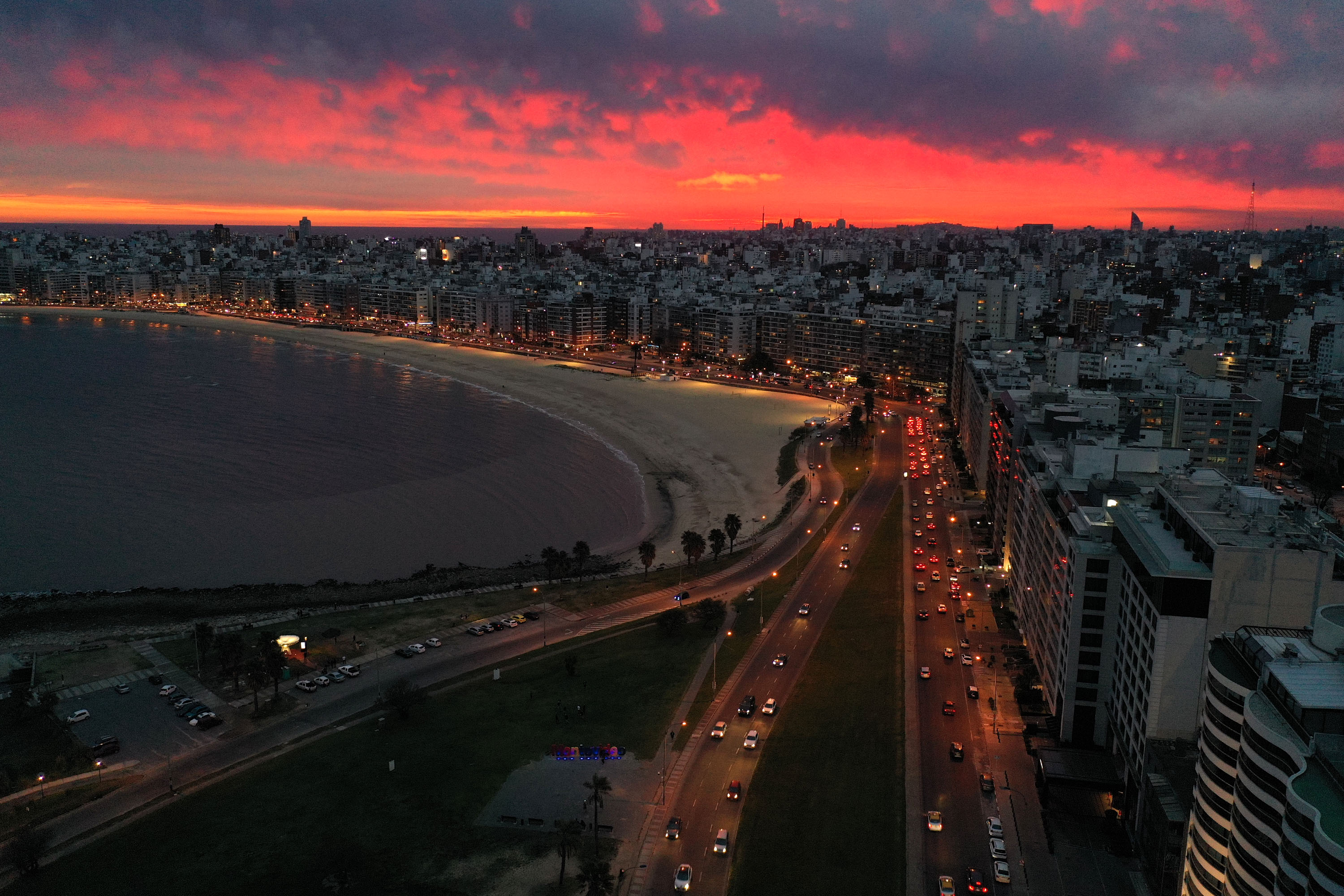
Sunset in Montevideo.

=== Climate ===
Montevideo has a humid subtropical climate (Köppen Cfa) in a middle latitude, the city experiences the four seasons. It has cool winters (June to August), warm to hot summers (December to February), mild autumns (March to May) and volatile springs (September to November); The climate is characterized by having mild temperatures, without harsh cold or extreme heat. There are numerous thunderstorms but no tropical cyclones. Rainfall is regular and evenly spread throughout the year, reaching around 950 millimeters (37 in).

Winters are generally cool, wet, windy and overcast. The average temperature during this season is just above 10 °C (50 °F). Daytime temperatures are generally between 10 °C (50 °F) and 18 °C (64 °F), and night lows between 3 °C (37 °F) and 10 °C (50 °F). During this season, there are bursts of icy and relatively dry winds of continental polar air masses, giving an unpleasant chilly feeling to the everyday life of the city, with daytime temperatures around or below 8 °C (46 °F) and possible night frosts. These occur few times during winter, with temperatures generally not falling below −2 °C (28 °F) because of the oceanic influence that moderates the temperature; a few kilometres inland, frosts are more common and colder. On the other hand, even in the middle of winter it's not uncommon to have temperatures above 20 °C (68 °F) for a few days. Rainfall and sleet are a frequent winter occurrence, but snowfall is extremely rare: flurries have been recorded only four times but with no accumulation, the last one on 13 July 1930 during the inaugural match of the World Cup, (the other three snowfalls were in 1850, 1853 and 1917); the alleged 1980 Carrasco snowfall was actually a hailstorm.

Summers are warm-hot and humid, with less wind than other seasons. The average temperature in this season is 23 °C (73 °F). Daytime temperatures are usually between 24 °C (75 °F) and 32 °C (90 °F), while night lows between 14 °C (57 °F) and 22 °C (72 °F). During this season, a moderate wind often blows from the sea in the evenings which has a pleasant cooling effect on the city, in contrast to the more severe summer heat of nearby cities like Buenos Aires. Heat waves come with the north winds, which bring humid and hot air masses from the tropical interior of the continent; temperatures can rise above 35 °C (95 °F). These warm periods are usually followed by thunderstorms, generated by cold fronts from the southwest that lowers temperatures considerably. This phenomenon is regional, and can occur several times all year long.

The autumn in Montevideo is quite pleasant and not so unstable. Daytime temperatures are in general around 20 °C (68 °F) and nights around 10 °C (50 °F). Spring average temperatures are very similar to the autumn, but the weather in that season tends to be more windy and volatile, with more dramatic changes in a short period of time.

Montevideo has an annual average temperature of 16.7 °C (62.1 °F). The lowest recorded temperature is −5.6 °C (21.9 °F) while the highest is 42.8 °C (109.0 °F).

Climate data for Montevideo (Prado), 1991–2020 normals, extremes 1901–present
Month	Jan	Feb	Mar	Apr	May	Jun	Jul	Aug	Sep	Oct	Nov	Dec	Year
Record high °C (°F)	42.8 (109.0)	40.3 (104.5)	38.4 (101.1)	36.7 (98.1)	32.0 (89.6)	27.8 (82.0)	29.8 (85.6)	32.6 (90.7)	32.7 (90.9)	35.8 (96.4)	38.2 (100.8)	40.8 (105.4)	42.8 (109.0)
Mean daily maximum °C (°F)	27.8 (82.0)	27.0 (80.6)	25.3 (77.5)	22.0 (71.6)	18.5 (65.3)	15.6 (60.1)	14.7 (58.5)	16.7 (62.1)	17.9 (64.2)	20.7 (69.3)	23.7 (74.7)	26.4 (79.5)	21.4 (70.5)
Daily mean °C (°F)	23.3 (73.9)	22.8 (73.0)	21.2 (70.2)	18.1 (64.6)	14.8 (58.6)	11.9 (53.4)	11.0 (51.8)	12.6 (54.7)	13.9 (57.0)	16.5 (61.7)	19.2 (66.6)	21.8 (71.2)	17.3 (63.1)
Mean daily minimum °C (°F)	18.8 (65.8)	18.6 (65.5)	17.1 (62.8)	14.1 (57.4)	11.0 (51.8)	8.1 (46.6)	7.3 (45.1)	8.5 (47.3)	9.9 (49.8)	12.4 (54.3)	14.7 (58.5)	17.1 (62.8)	13.1 (55.6)
Record low °C (°F)	6.0 (42.8)	6.8 (44.2)	3.8 (38.8)	1.3 (34.3)	−2.0 (28.4)	−5.6 (21.9)	−5.0 (23.0)	−3.8 (25.2)	−2.4 (27.7)	−1.5 (29.3)	2.5 (36.5)	5.0 (41.0)	−5.6 (21.9)
Average precipitation mm (inches)	94.6 (3.72)	93.8 (3.69)	105.8 (4.17)	111.1 (4.37)	83.4 (3.28)	89.4 (3.52)	93.2 (3.67)	89.9 (3.54)	92.1 (3.63)	102.2 (4.02)	95.9 (3.78)	91.3 (3.59)	1,142.7 (44.99)
Average precipitation days (≥ 1.0 mm)	6	6	6	7	6	7	6	7	7	7	7	7	79
Average relative humidity (%)	70	73	76	77	79	81	80	78	76	74	72	70	76
Mean monthly sunshine hours	294.5	234.5	220.1	162.0	161.2	126.0	142.6	164.3	180.0	226.3	249.0	282.1	2,442.6
Mean daily sunshine hours	9.5	8.3	7.1	5.4	5.2	4.2	4.6	5.3	6.0	7.3	8.3	9.1	6.7
Mean daily daylight hours	14.2	13.3	12.3	11.2	10.3	9.8	10.1	10.9	11.9	13	14	14.5	12.1
Average ultraviolet index	12	11	9	6	3	2	2	4	6	8	10	12	7
Source 1: Instituto Uruguayo de Metereología
Source 2: Instituto Nacional de Investigación Agropecuaria (sun and humidity 1980–2009), NOAA (precipitation 1991–2020) Source 3: Weather Atlas(daylight-UV)

Climate data for Carrasco International Airport, 1991–2020 normals, 1961–1990 humidity, extremes 1951–present
Month	Jan	Feb	Mar	Apr	May	Jun	Jul	Aug	Sep	Oct	Nov	Dec	Year
Record high °C (°F)	39.6 (103.3)	39.8 (103.6)	37.0 (98.6)	35.0 (95.0)	31.9 (89.4)	28.2 (82.8)	29.8 (85.6)	33.2 (91.8)	34.3 (93.7)	34.9 (94.8)	37.7 (99.9)	39.9 (103.8)	39.9 (103.8)
Mean daily maximum °C (°F)	27.3 (81.1)	26.7 (80.1)	25.2 (77.4)	21.9 (71.4)	18.5 (65.3)	15.5 (59.9)	14.5 (58.1)	16.6 (61.9)	17.6 (63.7)	20.2 (68.4)	23.2 (73.8)	26.0 (78.8)	21.1 (70.0)
Daily mean °C (°F)	22.6 (72.7)	22.3 (72.1)	20.8 (69.4)	17.7 (63.9)	14.4 (57.9)	11.5 (52.7)	10.6 (51.1)	12.1 (53.8)	13.4 (56.1)	16.0 (60.8)	18.6 (65.5)	21.2 (70.2)	16.8 (62.2)
Mean daily minimum °C (°F)	17.9 (64.2)	17.9 (64.2)	16.4 (61.5)	13.5 (56.3)	10.3 (50.5)	7.4 (45.3)	6.6 (43.9)	7.7 (45.9)	9.2 (48.6)	11.8 (53.2)	13.9 (57.0)	16.3 (61.3)	12.4 (54.3)
Record low °C (°F)	7.6 (45.7)	7.2 (45.0)	6.2 (43.2)	1.3 (34.3)	−1.0 (30.2)	−7.4 (18.7)	−5.4 (22.3)	−3.2 (26.2)	−3.6 (25.5)	1.5 (34.7)	3.4 (38.1)	6.5 (43.7)	−7.4 (18.7)
Average precipitation mm (inches)	93 (3.7)	96 (3.8)	112 (4.4)	107 (4.2)	88 (3.5)	95 (3.7)	97 (3.8)	93 (3.7)	93 (3.7)	105 (4.1)	92 (3.6)	93 (3.7)	1,163.1 (45.79)
Average precipitation days (≥ 1.0 mm)	6	7	7	7	7	7	7	7	7	8	7	7	84
Average relative humidity (%)	69	72	73	76	79	82	82	77	75	73	70	68	75
Mean monthly sunshine hours	287.0	233.9	224.2	183.6	159.1	131.5	148.3	165.2	187.7	207.3	245.8	273.7	2,447.3
Source: Instituto Uruguayo de Metereología

Sea temperature data for Montevideo
Month	Jan	Feb	Mar	Apr	May	Jun	Jul	Aug	Sep	Oct	Nov	Dec	Year
Average sea temperature °C (°F)	24.2 (75.6)	23.4 (74.1)	22.4 (72.3)	19.0 (66.2)	15.9 (60.6)	13.1 (55.6)	11.3 (52.3)	12.1 (53.8)	13.3 (55.9)	17.2 (63.0)	19.8 (67.6)	21.9 (71.4)	17.8 (64.0)
Source: Weather Atlas

=== Administrative divisions and barrios ===
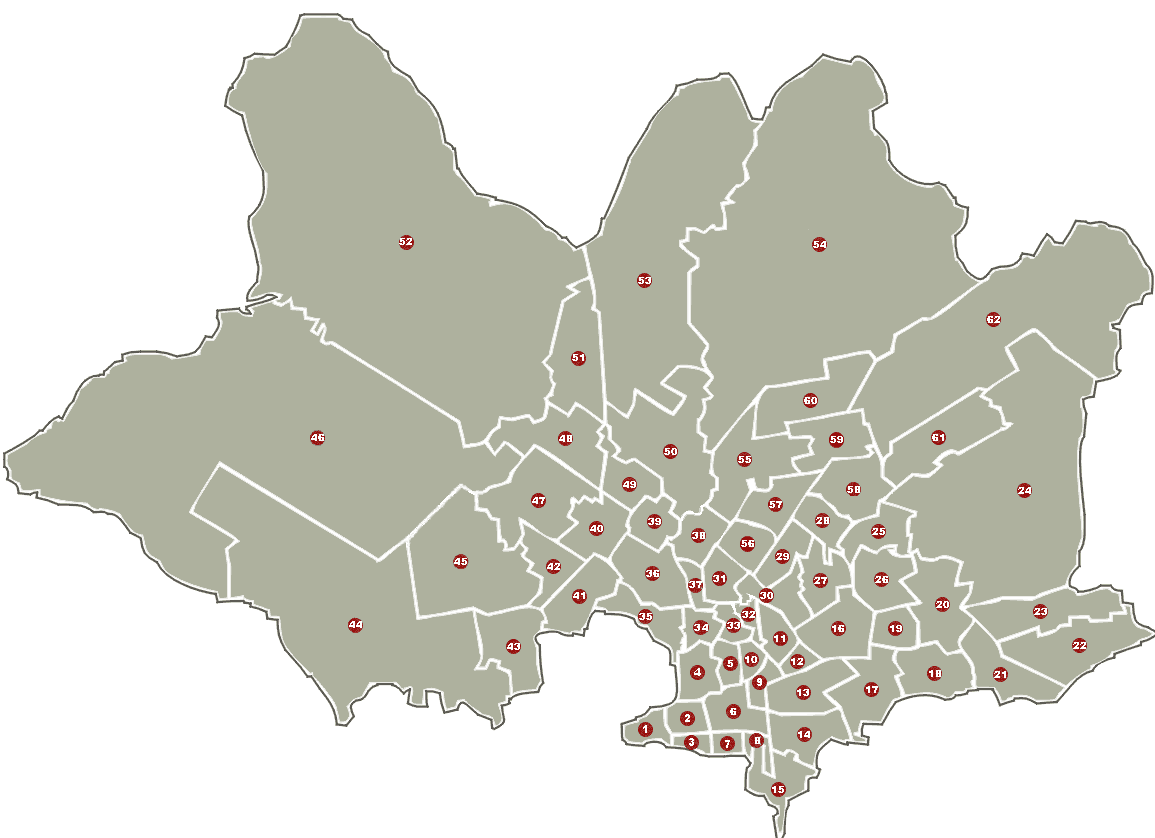
Map of the barrios of Montevideo

As of 2010, the city of Montevideo has been divided into 8 political municipalities (Municipios), referred to with letters from A to G, including CH, each presided over by a mayor elected by the citizens registered in the constituency. This division, according to the Municipality of Montevideo, "aims to advance political and administrative decentralization in the department of Montevideo, with the aim of deepening the democratic participation of citizens in governance." The head of each Municipio is called an alcalde or (if female) alcaldesa.

Of much greater importance is the division of the city into 62 barrios: neighborhoods or wards. Many of the city's barrios—such as Sayago, Ituzaingó and Pocitos—were previously geographically separate settlements, later absorbed by the growth of the city. Others grew up around certain industrial sites, including the salt-curing works of Villa del Cerro and the tanneries in Nuevo París. Each barrio has its own identity, geographic location and socio-cultural activities. A neighborhood of great significance is Ciudad Vieja, that was surrounded by a protective wall until 1829. This area contains most important buildings of the colonial era and early decades of independence.

1. Ciudad Vieja
2. Centro
3. Barrio Sur
4. Aguada
5. Villa Muñoz, Goes, Retiro
6. Cordón
7. Palermo
8. Parque Rodó
9. Tres Cruces
10. La Comercial
11. Larrañaga
12. La Blanqueada
13. Parque Batlle – Villa Dolores
14. Pocitos
15. Punta Carretas
16. Unión
17. Buceo
18. Malvín
19. Malvín Norte
20. Las Canteras
21. Punta Gorda
22. Carrasco
23. Carrasco Norte
24. Bañados de Carrasco
25. Flor de Maroñas
26. Maroñas – Parque Guaraní
27. Villa Española
28. Ituzaingó
29. Castro – Pérez Castellanos
30. Mercado Modelo - Bolívar
31. Brazo Oriental
32. Jacinto Vera
33. La Figurita
34. Reducto
35. Capurro – Bella Vista, Arroyo Seco
36. Prado – Nueva Savona
37. Atahualpa
38. Aires Puros
39. Paso de las Duranas
40. Belvedere
41. La Teja
42. Tres Ombúes – Pueblo Victoria
43. Villa del Cerro
44. Casabó – Pajas Blancas, Rincón del Cerro
45. La Paloma – Tomkinson
46. Paso de la Arena – Los Bulevares – Santiago Vázquez
47. Nuevo París
48. Conciliación
49. Sayago
50. Peñarol – Lavalleja
51. Colón Centro y Noroeste
52. Lezica – Melilla
53. Colón Sudeste – Abayubá
54. Manga – Toledo Chico
55. Casavalle, Barrio Borro
56. Cerrito de la Victoria
57. Las Acacias
58. Jardines del Hipódromo
59. Piedras Blancas
60. Manga
61. Punta de Rieles - Bella Italia
62. Villa García – Manga Rural

=== Landmarks ===
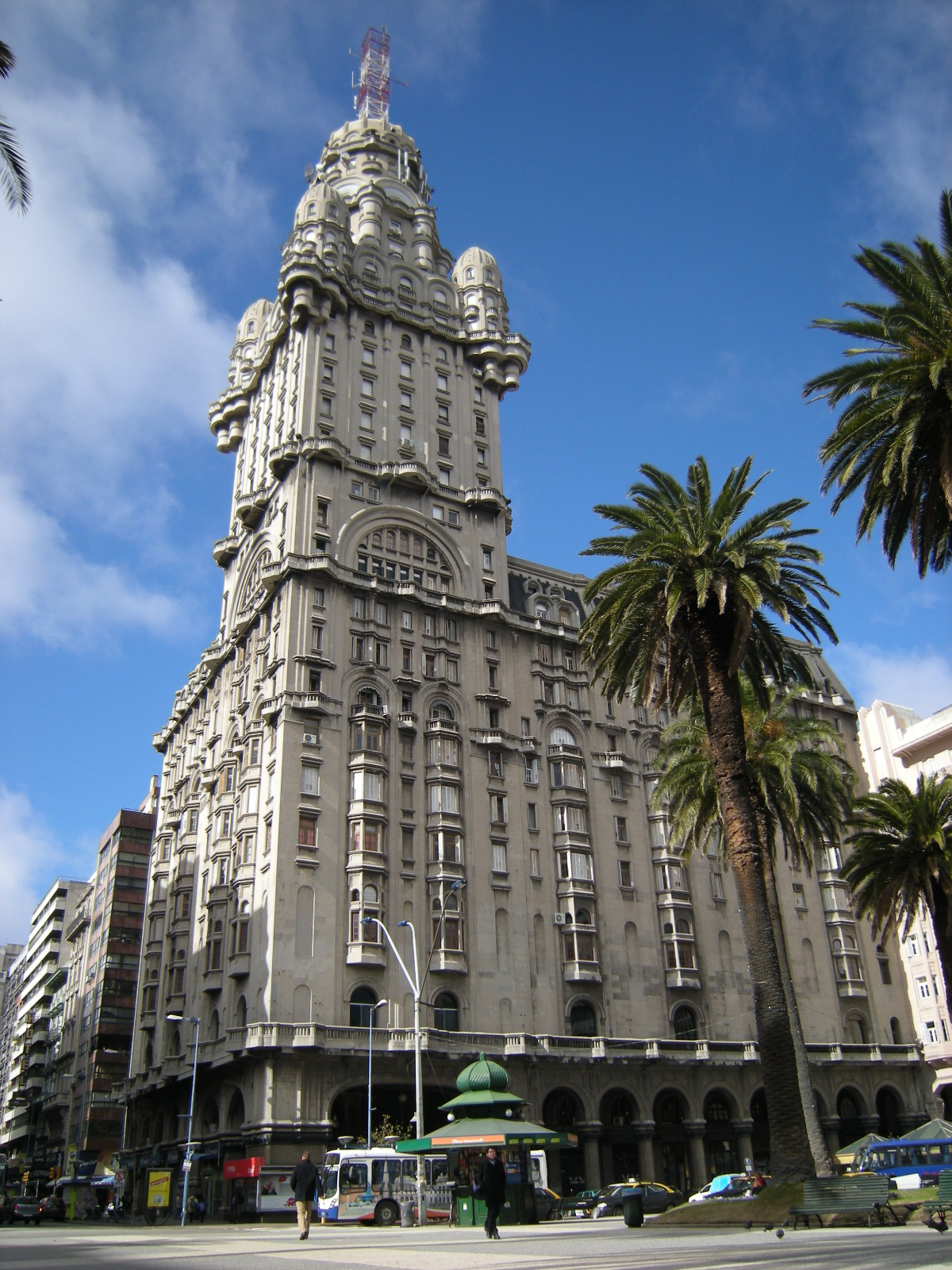
Palacio Salvo.

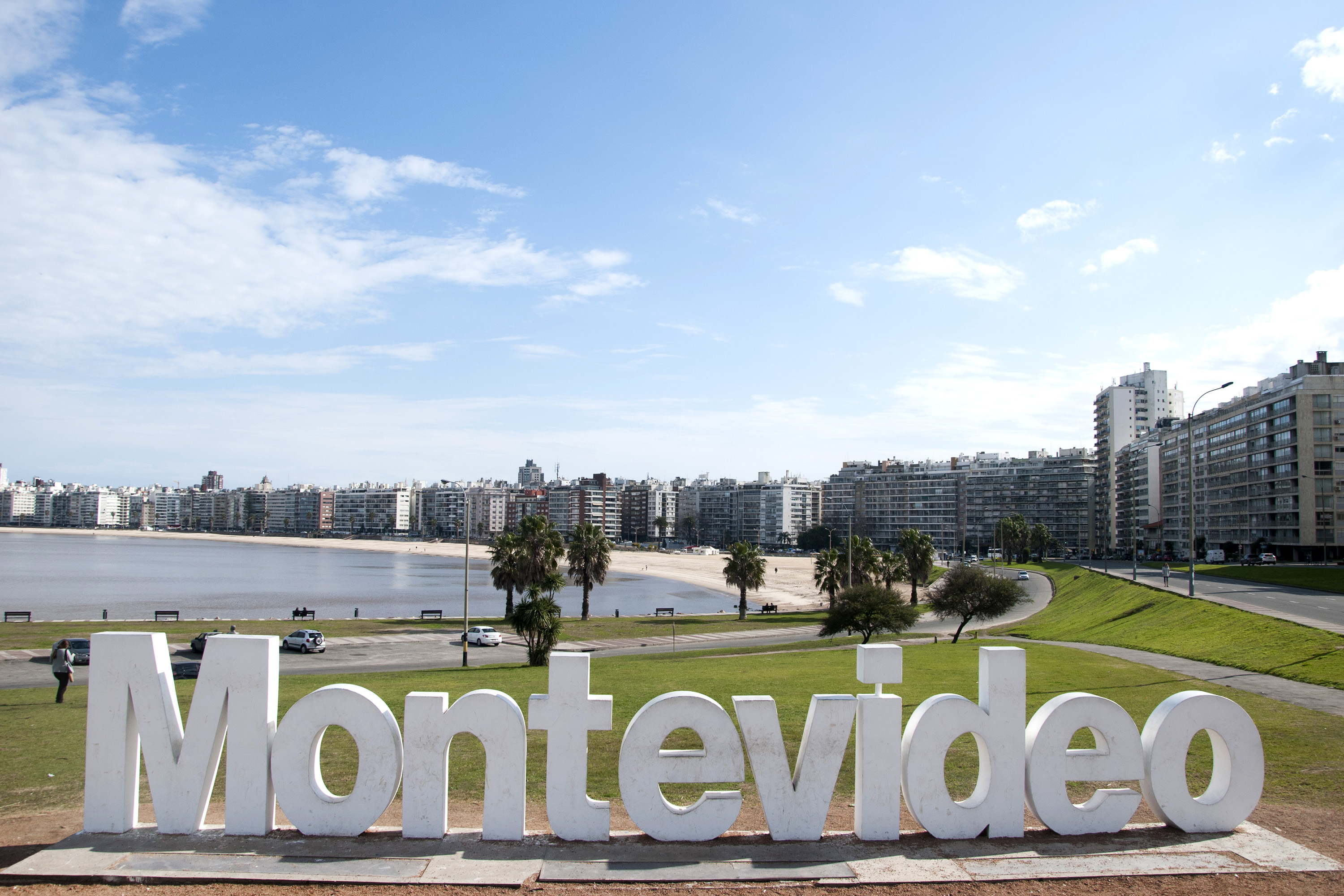
Pocitos is the most populous Montevideo neighborhood.

The architecture of Montevideo ranges from Neoclassical buildings such as the Montevideo Metropolitan Cathedral to the late-modern style of the World Trade Center Montevideo or the 158-meter (518 ft) ANTEL Telecommunication Tower, the tallest skyscraper in the country. Along with the Telecommunications Tower, the Palacio Salvo dominates the skyline of the Bay of Montevideo. The building facades in the Old Town reflect the city's extensive European immigration, displaying the influence of old European architecture. Notable government buildings include the Legislative Palace, the City Hall, Estévez Palace and the Executive Tower. The most notable sports stadium is the Estadio Centenario within Parque Batlle. Parque Batlle, Parque Rodó and Parque Prado are Montevideo's three great parks.

The Pocitos district, near the beach of the same name, has many homes built by Bello and Reboratti between 1920 and 1940, with a mixture of styles. Other landmarks in Pocitos are the "Edificio Panamericano" designed by Raul Sichero, and the "Positano" and "El Pilar" designed by Adolfo Sommer Smith and Luis García Pardo in the 1950s and 1960s. However, the construction boom of the 1970s and 1980s transformed the face of this neighborhood, with a cluster of modern apartment buildings for upper and upper middle-class residents.

==== Palacio Legislativo ====
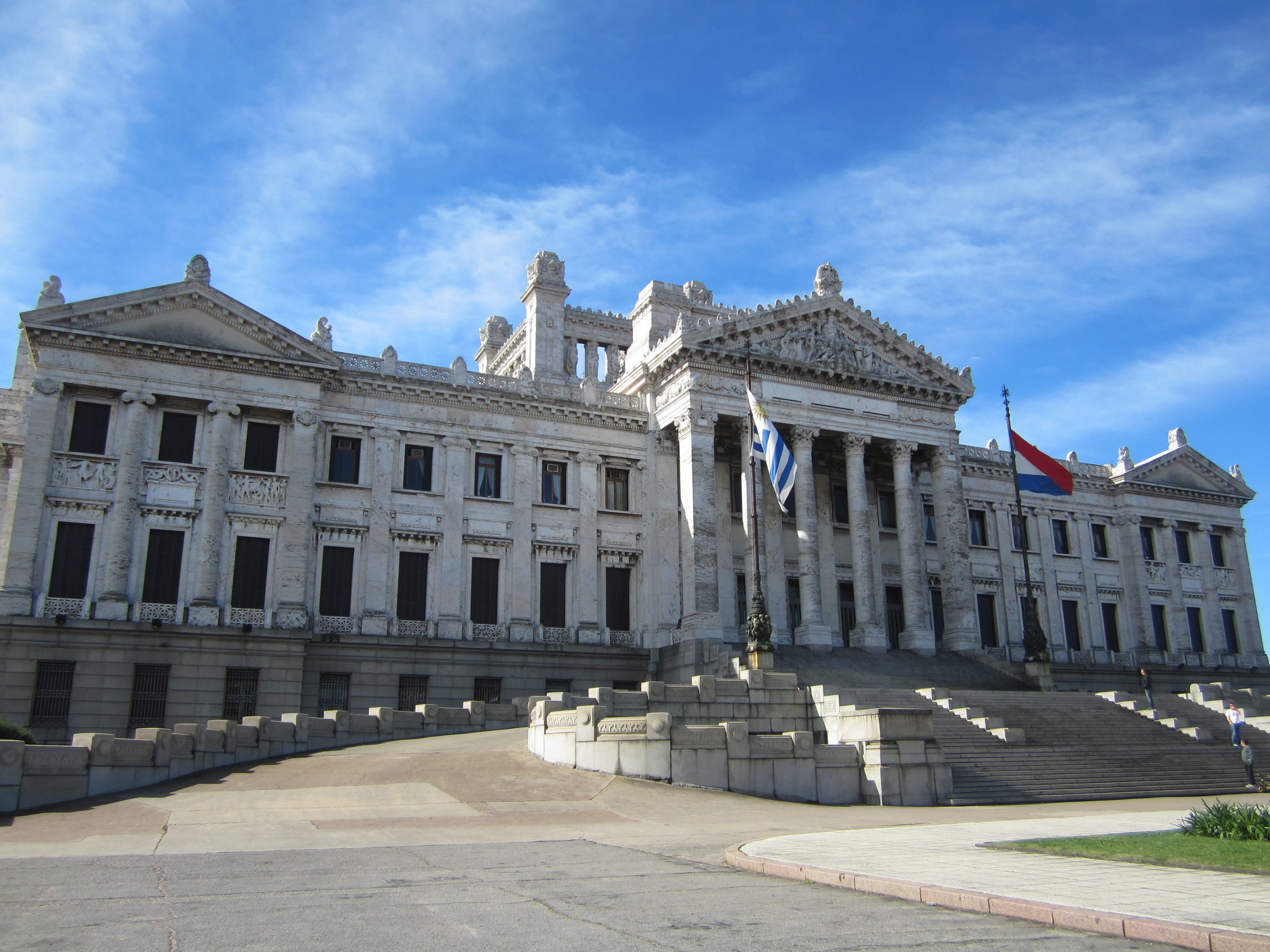
The Legislative Palace.

The Palacio Legislativo in Aguada, north of the city center, is the seat of the Uruguayan Parliament. Construction started in 1904 and was sponsored by the government of President José Batlle y Ordóñez. It was designed by Italian architects Vittorio Meano and Gaetano Moretti, who planned the building's interior. Among the notable contributors to the project was sculptor José Belloni, who contributed numerous reliefs and allegorical sculptures.

==== World Trade Center Montevideo ====
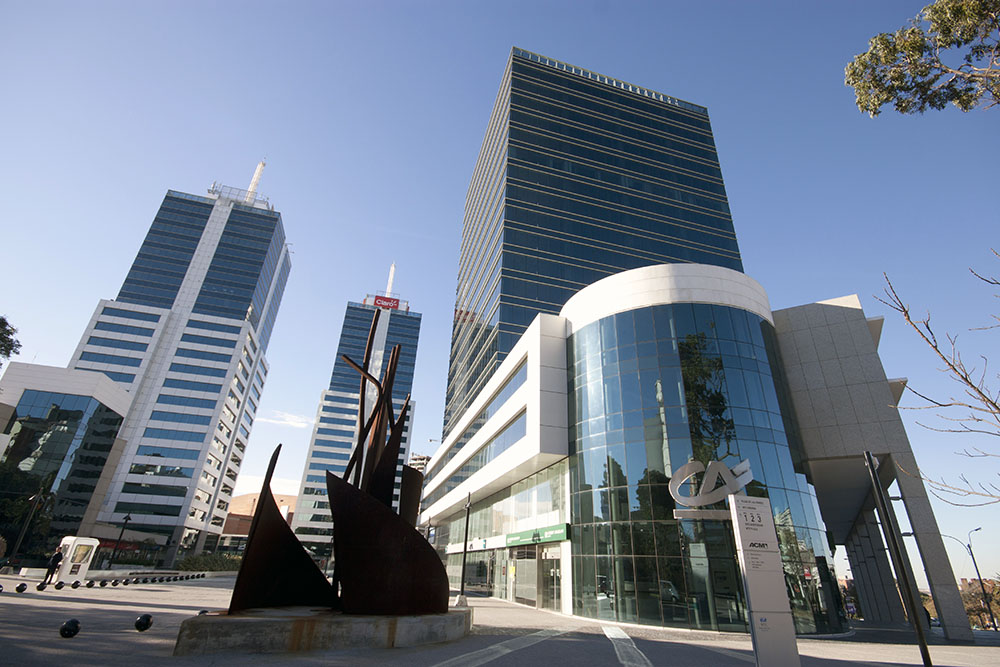
World Trade Center Montevideo.

World Trade Center Montevideo officially opened in 1998, but work was completed in 2009. The complex is composed of three towers, two three-story buildings called World Trade Center Plaza and World Trade Center Avenue and a large central square called Towers Square. World Trade Center 1 was the first building to be inaugurated, in 1998. It has 22 floors and 17,100 square meters of space. That same year the avenue and the auditorium were raised. World Trade Center 2 was inaugurated in 2002, a twin tower of World Trade Center 1. Finally, in 2009, World Trade Center 3 and the World Trade Center Plaza and the Towers Square were inaugurated. It is located between the avenues Luis Alberto de Herrera and 26 de Marzo and has 19 floors and 27,000 square meters (290,000 sq ft) of space. The 6,300-square-meter (68,000 sq ft) World Trade Center Plaza is designed to be a center of gastronomy opposite Towers Square and Bonavita St.

The Towers Square, is an area of remarkable aesthetic design, intended to be a platform for the development of business activities, art exhibitions, dance and music performances and social places. This square connects the different buildings and towers which comprise the WTC Complex and it is the main access to the complex. The square contains various works of art, notably a sculpture by renowned Uruguayan sculptor Pablo Atchugarry. World Trade Center 4, with 40 floors and 53,500 square meters (576,000 sq ft) of space is under construction as of 2010.

==== Telecommunications Tower ====
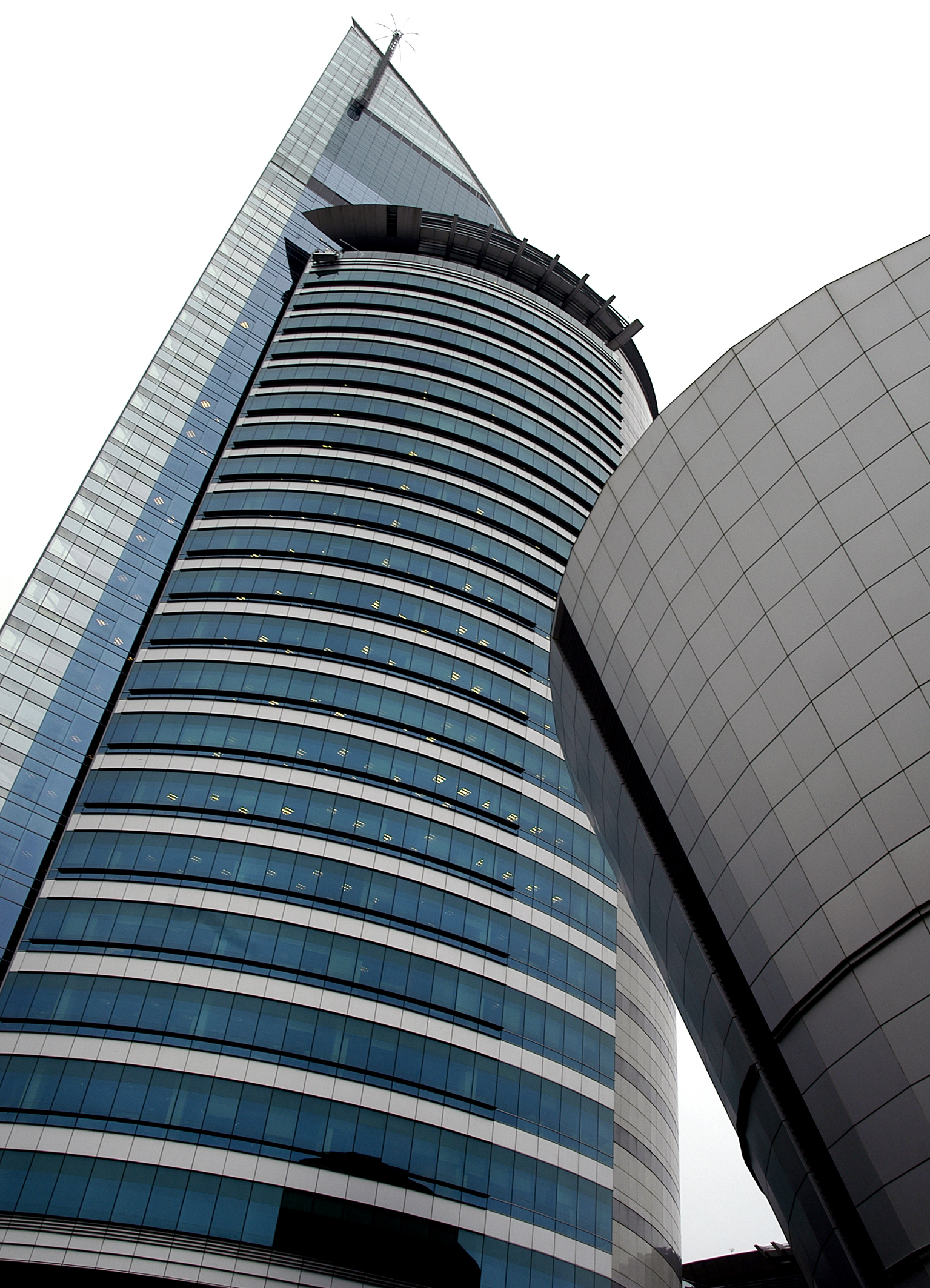
Telecommunications Tower.

Torre de las Telecomunicaciones (Telecommunications Tower) or Torre Antel (Antel Tower) is the 158 meters (518 ft), 37-floor headquarters of Uruguay's government-owned telecommunications company, ANTEL, and is the tallest building in the country. It was designed by architect Carlos Ott. It is situated by the side of the Bay of Montevideo. The tower was completed by American Bridge Company and other design/build consortium team members on 15 March 2000.

When its construction was announced, many politicians complained about its cost (US$40 million, plus US$25 million for the construction of the other 5 buildings of the Telecommunications Complex). Problems during its construction turned the original US$65 million price into US$102 million.

==== Ciudad Vieja (Old City) ====
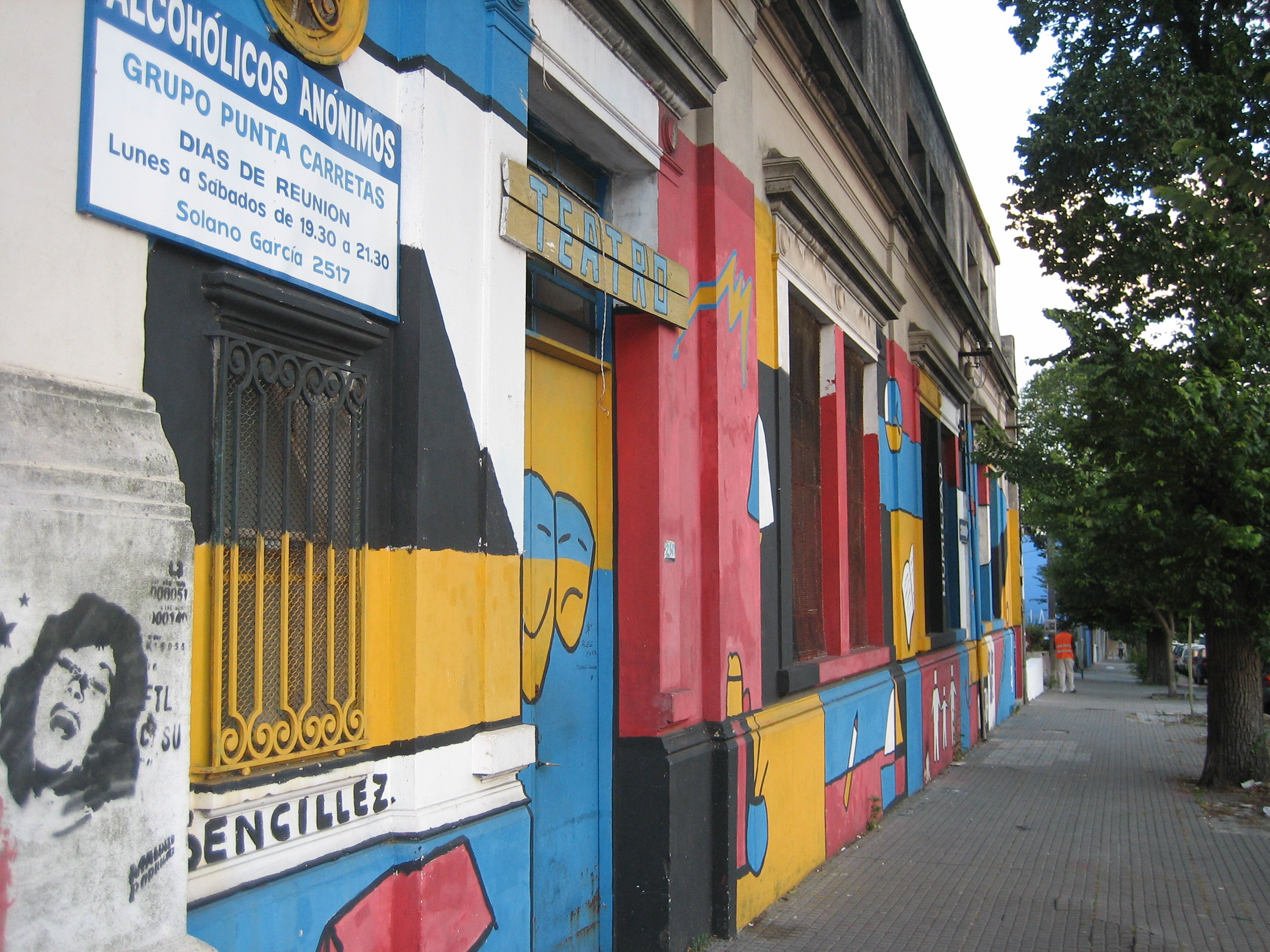
Headquarters of Alcohólicos Anónimos in Montevideo

Ciudad Vieja was the earliest part of the city to be developed and today it constitutes a prominent barrio of southwest Montevideo. It contains many colonial buildings and national heritage sites, but also many banks, administrative offices, museums, art galleries, cultural institutions, restaurants and nightclubs, making it vibrant with life. Its northern coast is the main port of Uruguay, one of the few deep-draft ports in the Southern Cone of South America.

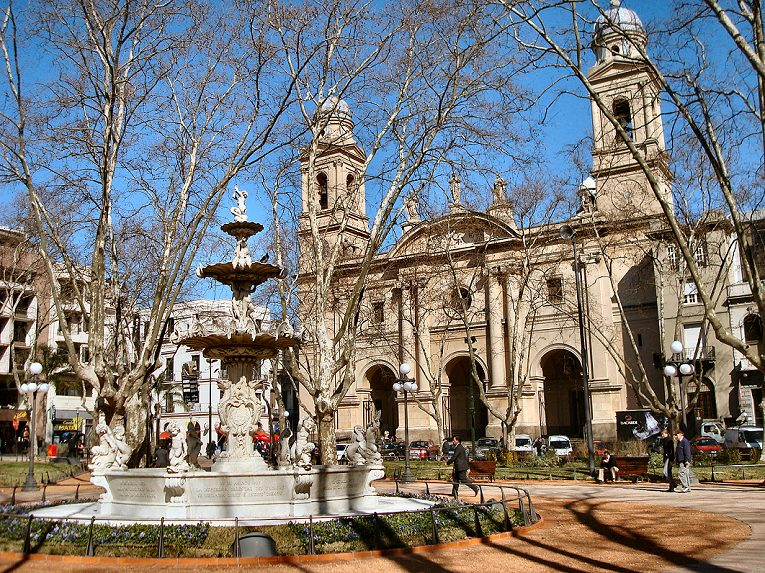
Plaza de la Constitución in winter.

Montevideo's most important plaza is Plaza Independencia, located between Ciudad Vieja and downtown Montevideo. It starts with the Gateway of The Citadel at one end and ends at the beginning of 18 de Julio Avenue. It is the remaining part of the wall that surrounded the oldest part of the city. Several notable buildings are located here.

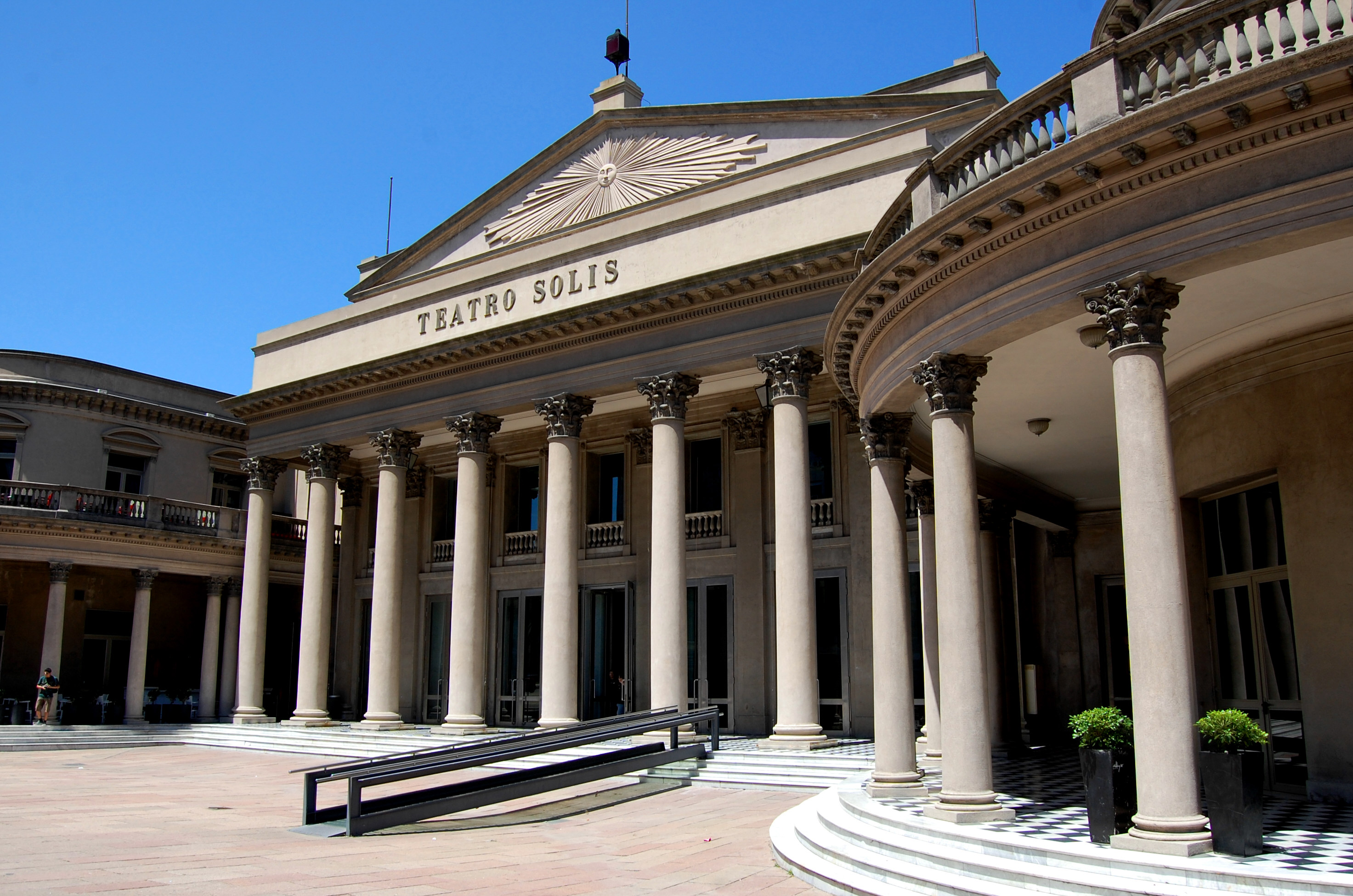
Solís Theatre.

The Solís Theatre is Uruguay's oldest theater. It was built in 1856 and is owned by the government of Montevideo. In 1998, the government of Montevideo started a major reconstruction of the theater, which included two US$110,000 columns designed by Philippe Starck. The reconstruction was completed in 2004, and the theater reopened in August of that year. The plaza is also the site of the offices of the President of Uruguay (both the Estévez Palace and the Executive Tower). The Artigas Mausoleum is located at the center of the plaza. Statues include that of José Gervasio Artigas, a hero of Uruguay's independence movement; an honor guard keeps vigil at the Mausoleum.

Palacio Salvo, at the intersection of 18 de Julio Avenue and Plaza Independencia, was designed by the architect Mario Palanti and completed in 1928. Palanti, an Italian immigrant living in Buenos Aires, used a similar design for his Palacio Barolo in Buenos Aires, Argentina. Palacio Salvo stands 100 meters (330 ft) high, including its antenna. It is built on the former site of the Confitería La Giralda, renowned for being where Gerardo Matos Rodríguez wrote his tango "La Cumparsita" (1917.) Palacio Salvo was originally intended to function as a hotel but is now a mixture of offices and private residences.

Also of major note in Ciudad Vieja is the Plaza de la Constitución (or Plaza Matriz). During the first decades of Uruguayan independence this square was the main hub of city life. On the square are the Cabildo—the seat of colonial government—and the Montevideo Metropolitan Cathedral. The cathedral is the burial place of Fructuoso Rivera, Juan Antonio Lavalleja and Venancio Flores. Another notable square is Plaza Zabala with the equestrian statue of Bruno Mauricio de Zabala. On its south side, Palacio Taranco, once residence of the Ortiz Taranco brothers, is now the Museum of Decorative Arts. A few blocks northwest of Plaza Zabala is the Mercado del Puerto, another major tourist destination.

==== Parque Batlle ====
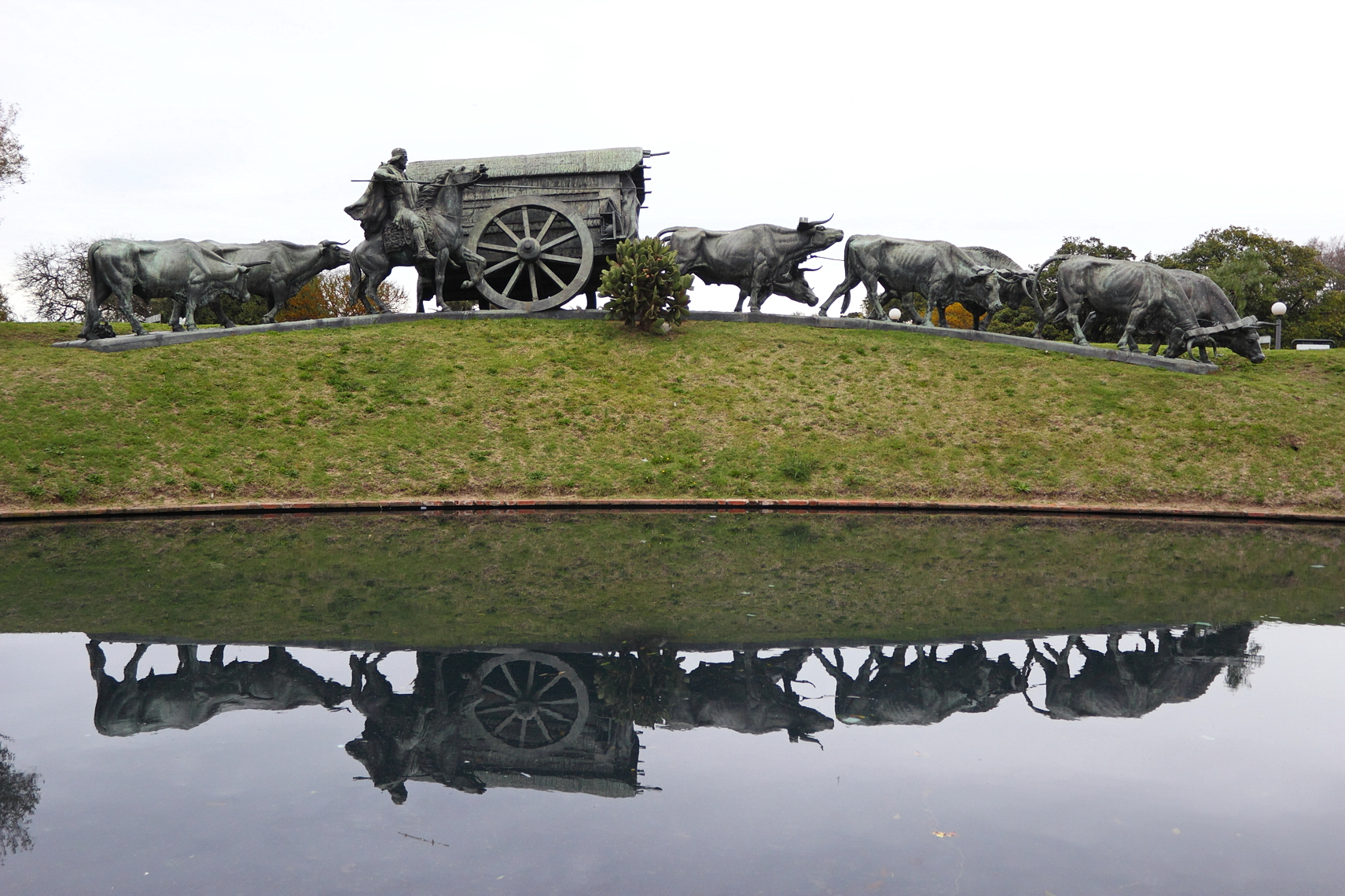
Monumento La Carreta.

Parque Batlle (formerly: Parque de los Aliados, translation: "Park of the Allies") is a major public central park, located south of Avenida Italia and north of Avenue Rivera. Along with Parque Prado and Parque Rodó it is one of three large parks that dominate Montevideo. The park and surrounding area constitute one of the 62 neighborhoods (barrios) of the city. The barrio of Parque Batlle is one of seven coastal barrios, the others being Buceo, Carrasco, Malvin, Pocitos, Punta Carretas, and Punta Gorda. The barrio of Parque Batlle includes four former districts: Belgrano, Italiano, Villa Dolores and Batlle Park itself and borders the neighborhoods of La Blanqueada, Tres Cruces, Pocitos and Buceo. It has a high population density and most of its households are of medium-high- or high-income. Villa Dolores, a sub-district of Parque Batlle, took its name from the original villa of Don Alejo Rossell y Rius and of Doña Dolores Pereira de Rossel. On their grounds, they started a private collection of animals that became a zoological garden and was passed to the city in 1919; in 1955 the Planetarium of Montevideo was built within its premises.

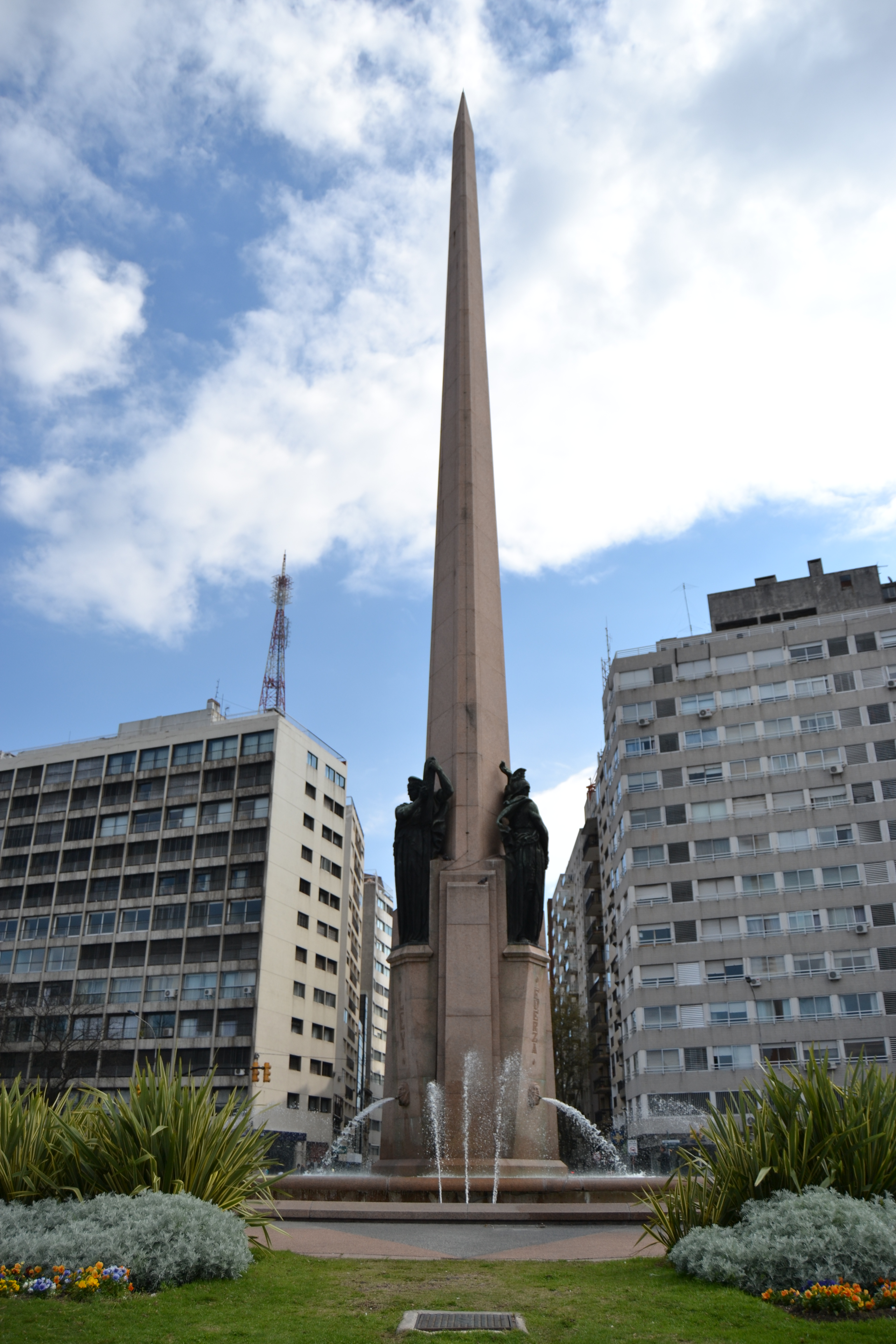
Obelisk of Montevideo in the Parque Batlle.

Parque Batlle is named in honor of José Batlle y Ordóñez, President of Uruguay from 1911 to 1915. The park was originally proposed by an Act of March 1907, which also projected wide boulevards and avenues. French landscape architect, Carlos Thays, began the plantings in 1911. In 1918, the park was named Parque de los Aliados, following the victory of the Allies of World War I. On 5 May 1930, after significant expansion, it was again renamed as Parque Batlle y Ordóñez, in memory of the prominent politician and president, who had died in 1929. The park was designated a National Historic Monument Park in 1975. As of 2010, the park covers an area of 60 hectares (150 acres) and is considered the "lung" of the Montevideo city due to the large variety of trees planted here.

The Estadio Centenario, the national football stadium, opened in 1930 for the first World Cup, and later hosted several other sporting grounds of note (see Sports).

In 1934, sculptor José Belloni's "La Carreta", a bronze monument on granite base, was installed on Avenida Lorenzo Merola near Estadio Centenario. One of several statues in the park, it depicts yoked oxen pulling a loaded wagon. It was designated a national monument in 1976. Another statue on the same side of the park is a bronze copy of the Discobolus of Myron.

On the west side of Parque Batlle, on Artigas Boulevard, the 1938 Obelisk of Montevideo is a monument dedicated to those who created the first Constitution. The work of sculptor José Luis Zorrilla de San Martín (1891–1975), it is a three-sided granite obelisk, 40 meters (130 ft) tall, with bronze statues on its three sides, representing "Law", "Liberty", and "Force", respectively. It has been a National Heritage Site since 1976.

==== Parque Prado ====
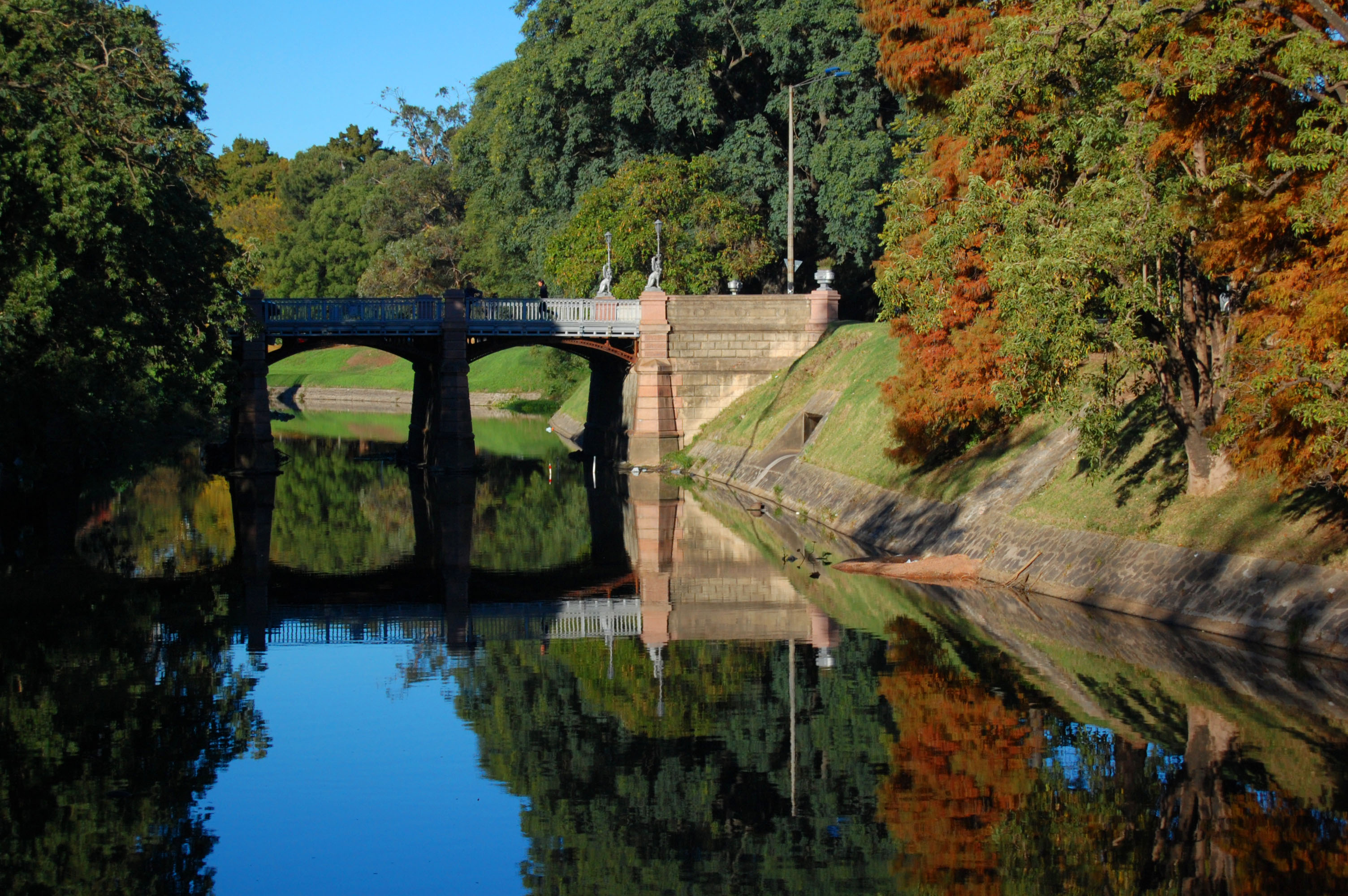
Bridge over the Miguelete stream in the Prado Park.

Established in 1873, the largest of Montevideo's six main public parks is the 1.06-square-kilometre (260-acre) Parque Prado. Located in the northern part of the city, the Miguelete Creek flows through the park and the neighborhood and of the same name. It is surrounded by the avenues Agraciada, Obes Lucas, Joaquín Suárez, Luis Alberto de Herrera and by the streets Castro and José María Reyes.

The most frequented areas of the park are the Rosedal, a public rose garden with pergolas, the Botanical Garden, the area around the Hotel del Prado, as well as the Rural del Prado, a seasonal cattle and farm animal fairground. The Rosedal contains four pergolas, eight domes, and a fountain; its 12,000 roses were imported from France in 1910. There are several jogging paths along the Miguelete river.

The Presidential Residence is located behind the Botanical Gardens. Established in 1930, Juan Manuel Blanes Museum is situated in the Palladian villa, a National Heritage Site since 1975, and includes a Japanese garden. The Professor Atilio Lombardo Museum and Botanical Gardens were established in 1902. The National Institute of Physical Climatology and its observatory are also in the Prado.

==== Parque Rodó ====
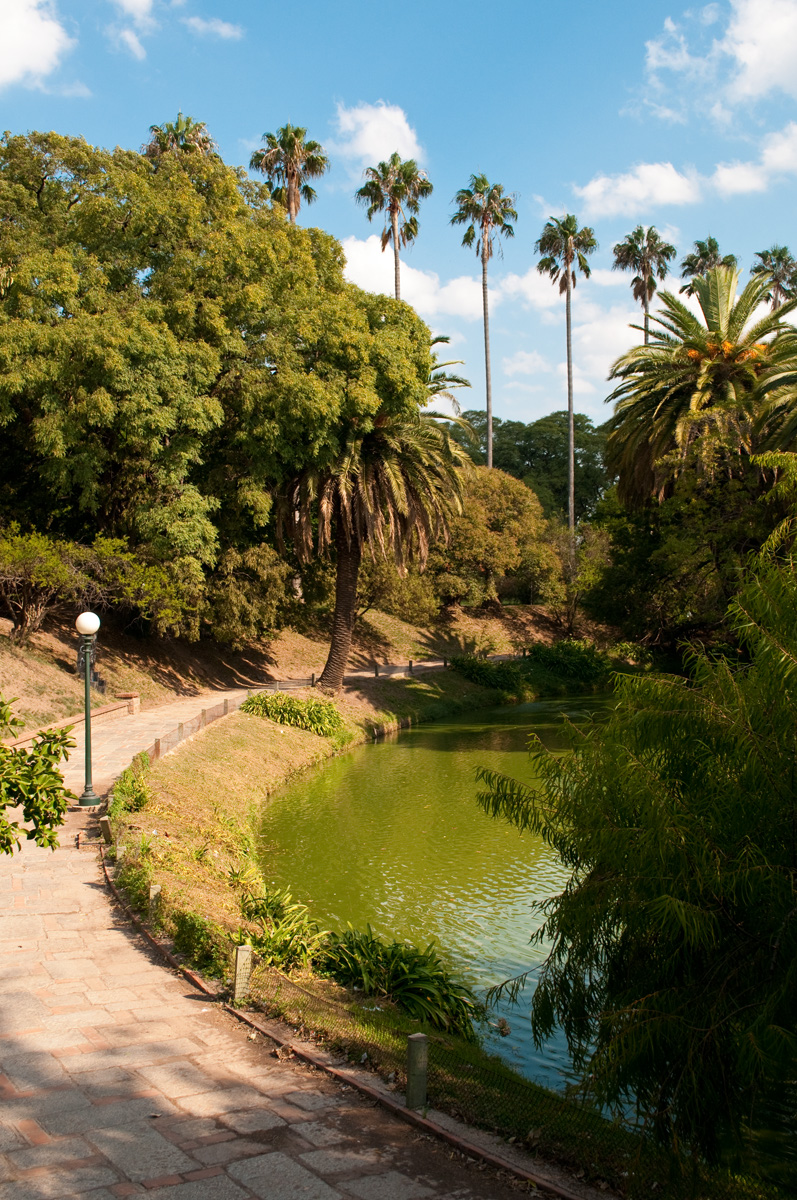
Parque Rodó park.

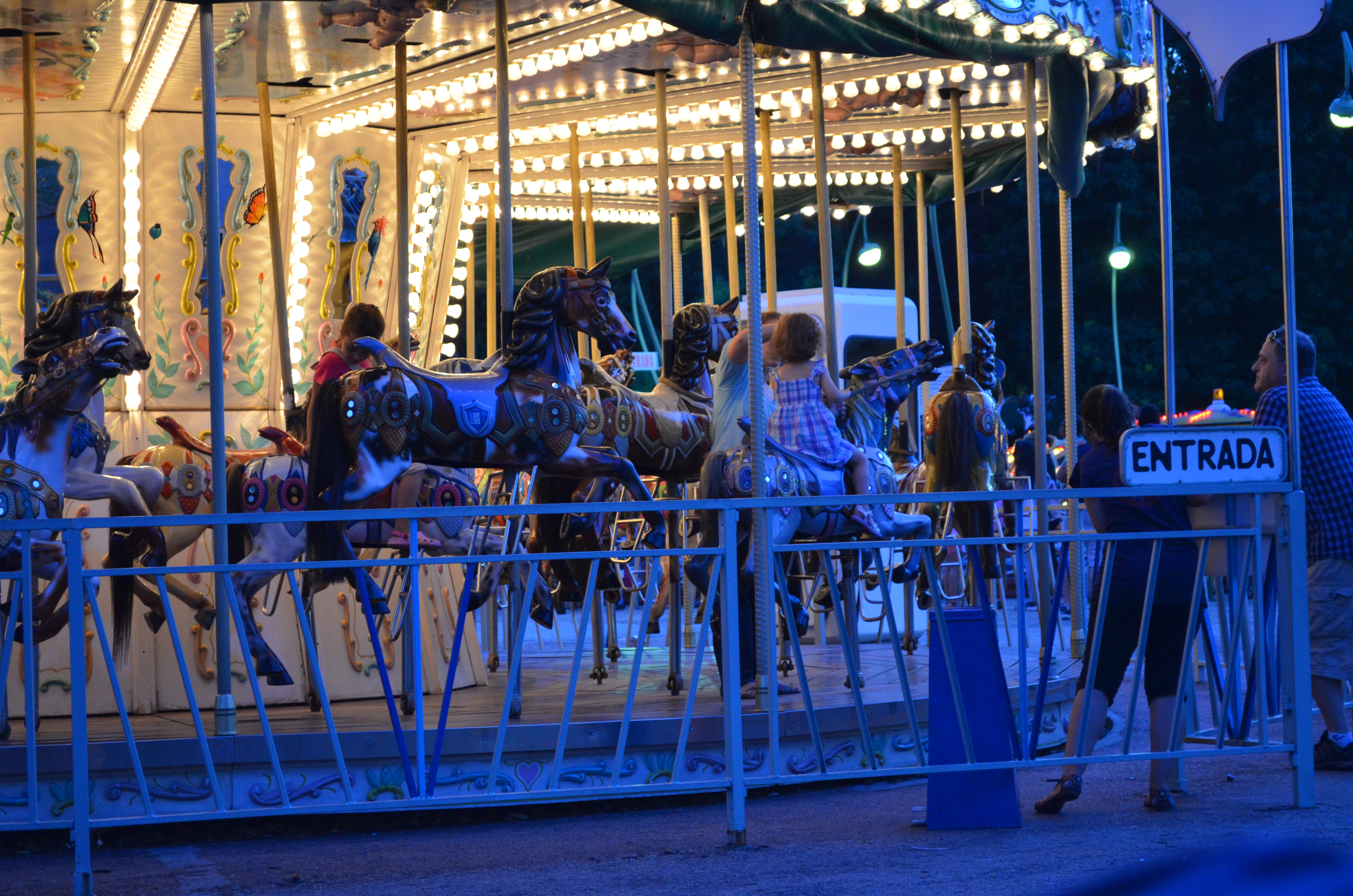
Parque Rodó amusement park.

Parque Rodó is both a barrio (neighborhood) of Montevideo and a park which lies mostly outside the limits of the neighborhood itself and belongs to Punta Carretas. The name "Rodó" commemorates José Enrique Rodó, an important Uruguayan writer whose monument is in the southern side of the main park. The park was conceived as a French-style city park. Apart from the main park area which is delimited by Sarmiento Avenue to the south, Parque Rodó includes an amusement park; the Estadio Luis Franzini, belonging to Defensor Sporting; the front lawn of the Faculty of Engineering and a strip west of the Club de Golf de Punta Carretas that includes the Canteras ("quarry") del Parque Rodó, the Teatro de Verano ("summer theatre") and the Lago ("lake") del Parque Rodó.

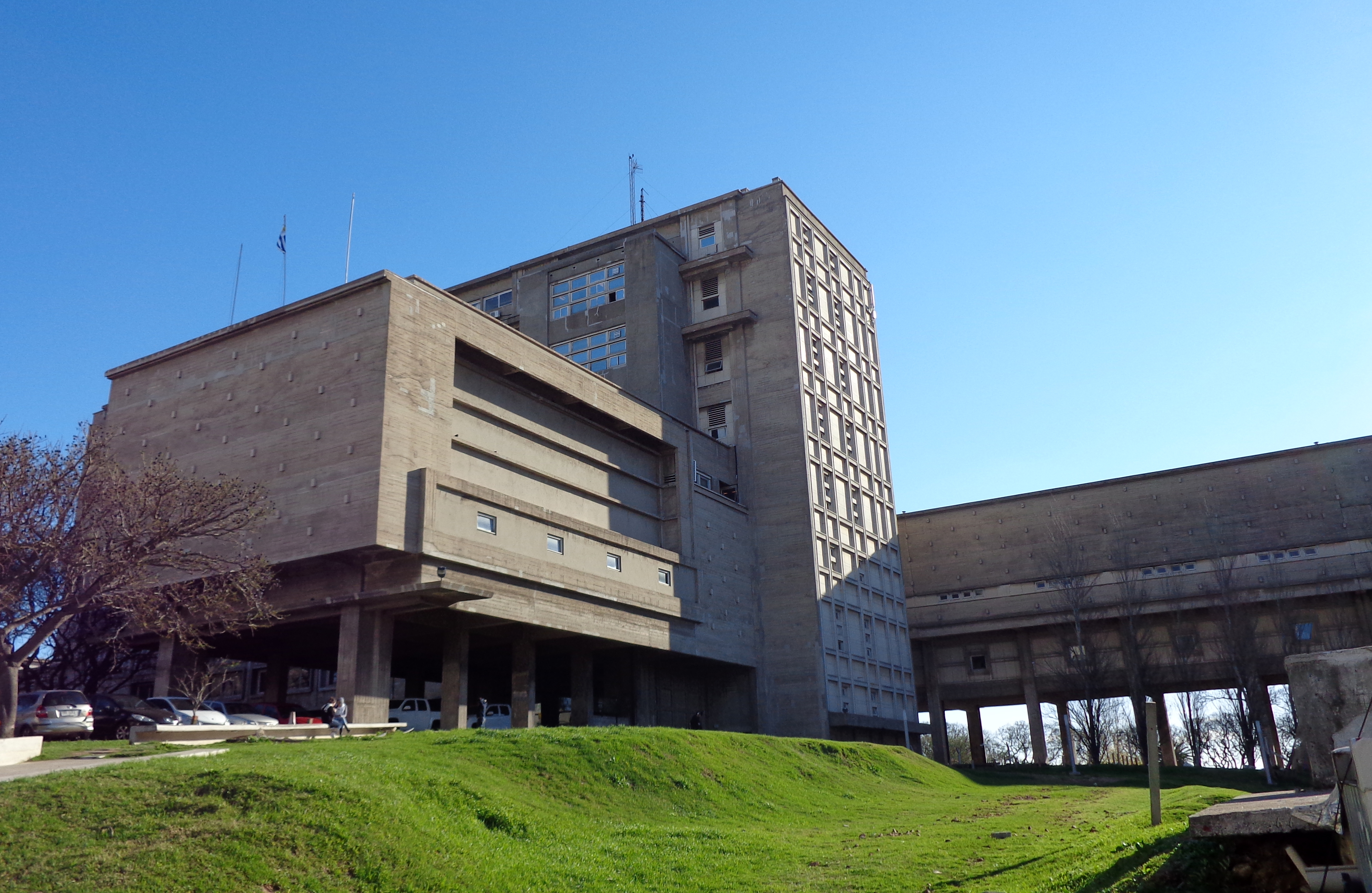
Faculty of Engineering located in Parque Rodó.

On the east side of the main park area is the National Museum of Visual Arts. On this side, a street market takes place every Sunday. On the north side is an artificial lake with a little castle housing a municipal library for children. An area to its west is used as an open-air exhibition of photography. West of the park, across the coastal avenue Rambla Presidente Wilson, stretches Ramirez Beach. Directly west of the main park area, and belonging to Parque Rodó barrio, there is the former Parque Hotel, now called Edifício Mercosur, the seat of the parliament of the member countries of the Mercosur. During the guerilla war the Tupamaros frequently attacked buildings in this area, including the old hotel.

==== Forts ====
The first set of subsidiary forts was planned by the Portuguese at Montevideo in 1701 to establish a front-line base to stop frequent insurrections by the Spaniards emanating from Buenos Aires. These fortifications were planned within the River Plate estuary at Colonia del Sacramento. However, this plan came to fruition only in November 1723, when Captain Manuel Henriques de Noronha reached the shores of Montevideo with soldiers, guns and colonists on his warship Nossa Senhora de Oliveara. They built a small square fortification. However, under siege from forces from Buenos Aires, the Portuguese withdrew from Montevideo Bay in January 1724, after signing an agreement with the Spaniards.

===== Fortaleza del Cerro (Fortress del Cerro) =====
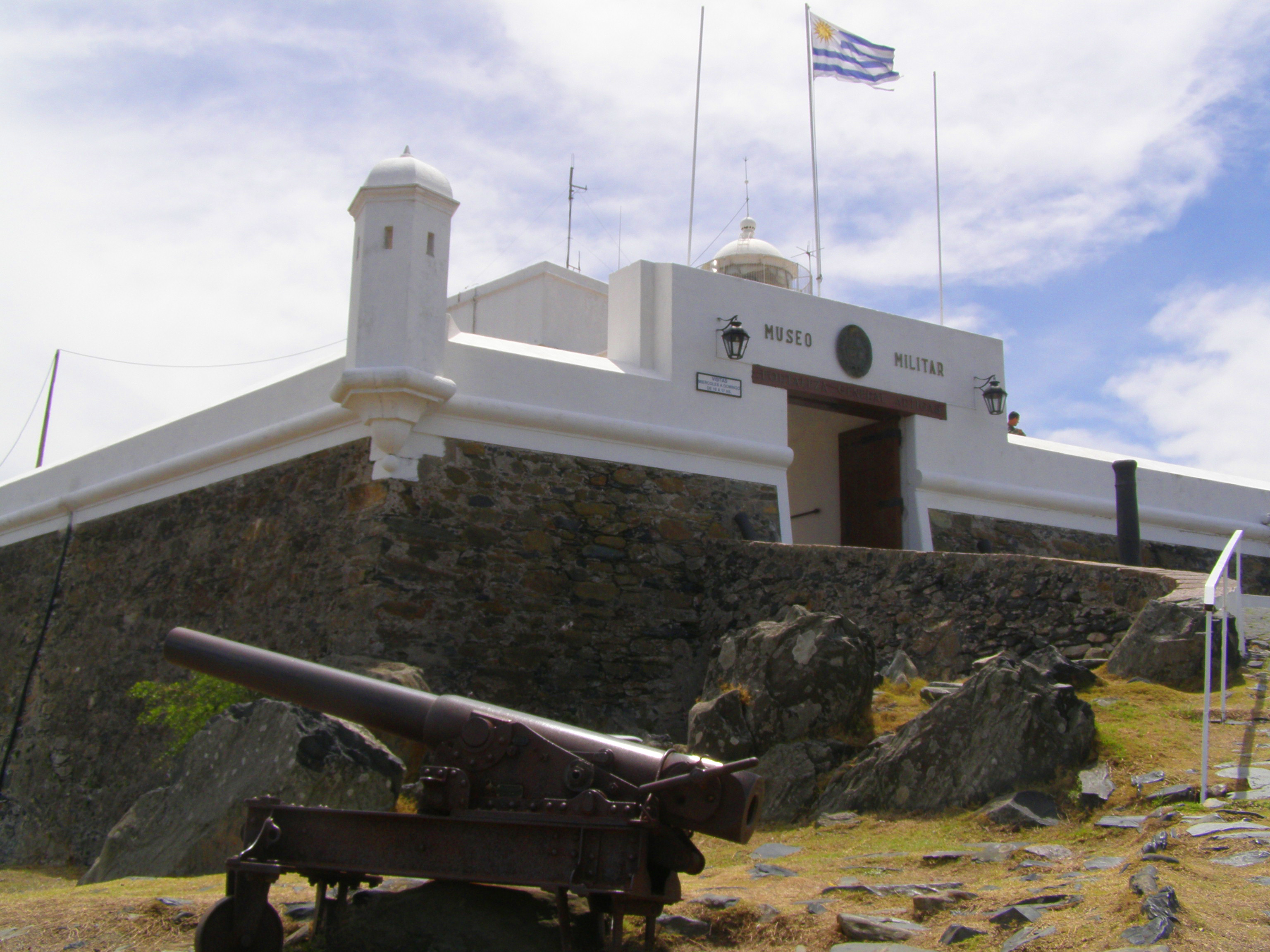
Fortaleza del Cerro.

Fortaleza del Cerro overlooks the bay of Montevideo. An observation post at this location was first built by the Spanish in the late 18th century. In 1802, a beacon replaced the observation post; construction of the fortress began in 1809 and was completed in 1839. It has been involved in many historical developments and has been repeatedly taken over by various sides. In 1907, the old beacon was replaced with a stronger electric one. It has been a National Monument since 1931 and has housed a military museum since 1916. Today it is one of the tourist attractions of Montevideo.

==== Punta Brava Lighthouse ====
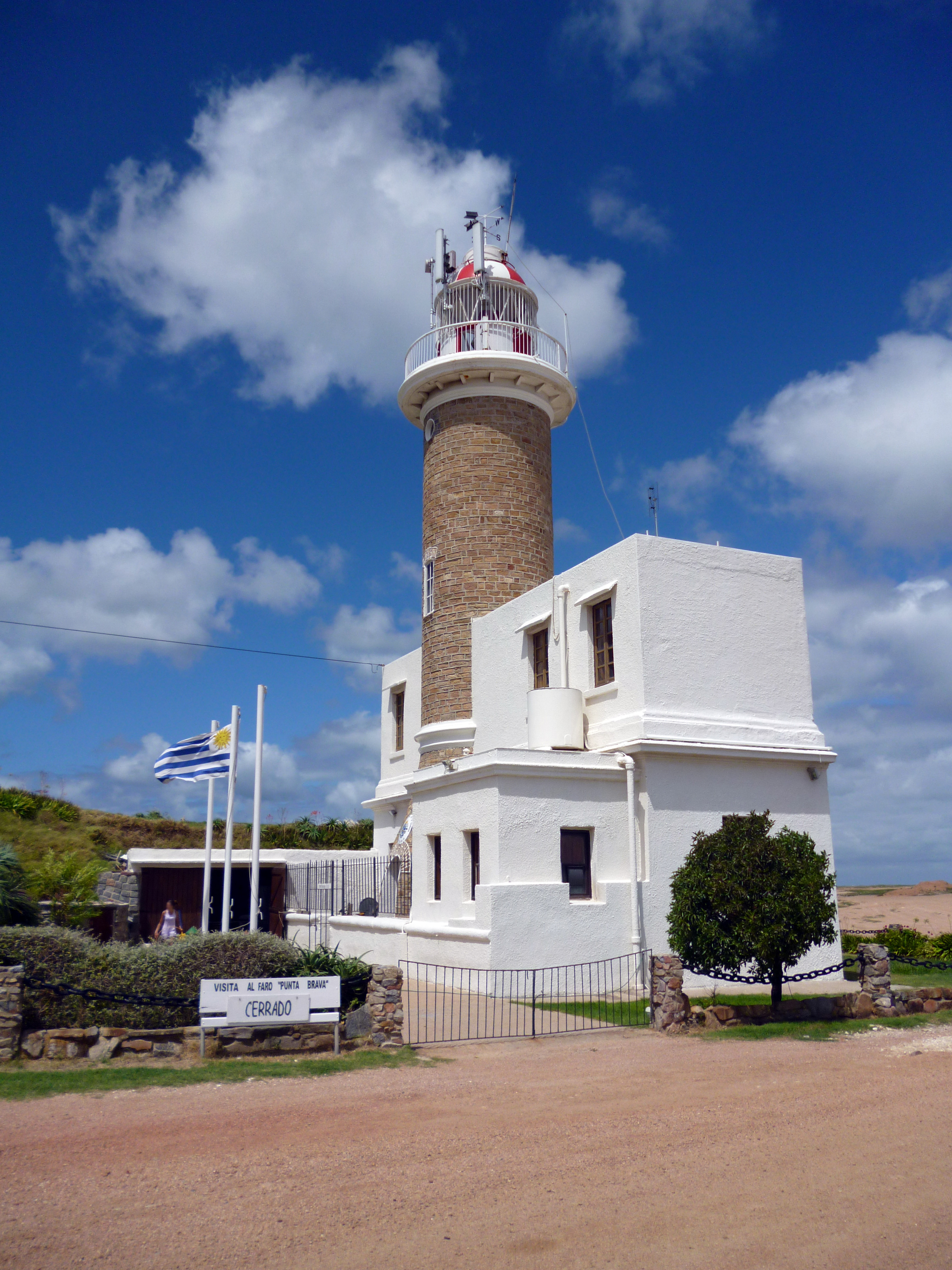
Punta Brava lighthouse.

Punta Brava Lighthouse (Faro Punta Brava), also known as Punta Carretas Lighthouse, was erected in 1876. The lighthouse is 21 meters (69 ft) high and its light reaches 24 km (15 mi) away, with a flash every ten seconds. In 1962, the lighthouse became electric. The lighthouse is important for guiding boats into the Banco Inglés Buceo Port or the entrance of the Santa Lucía River.

==== Rambla of Montevideo ====
The Rambla is an avenue that goes along the entire coastline of Montevideo. The literal meaning of the Spanish word rambla is "avenue" or "watercourse", but in the Americas it is mostly used as "coastal avenue", and since all the southern departments of Uruguay border either the Río de la Plata or the Atlantic Ocean, they all have ramblas as well. As an integral part of Montevidean identity, the Rambla has been included by Uruguay in the Indicative List of World Heritage sites, though it has not received this status. Previously, the entire Rambla was called Rambla Naciones Unidas ("United Nations"), but in recent times different names have been given to specific parts of it.

The Rambla is an important site for recreation and leisure in Montevideo. Every day, a large number of people visit this site. Its 27-kilometer (17 mi) length makes it one of the longest esplanades in the world.

Montevideo is noted for its beaches, which are particularly important because 60% of the population spends the summer in the city. Its best-known beaches are Ramírez, Pocitos, Carrasco, Buceo and Malvín. Further east and west are other beaches including the Colorada, Punta Espinillo, Punta Yeguas, Zabala and Santa Catarina.

==== Cemeteries ====
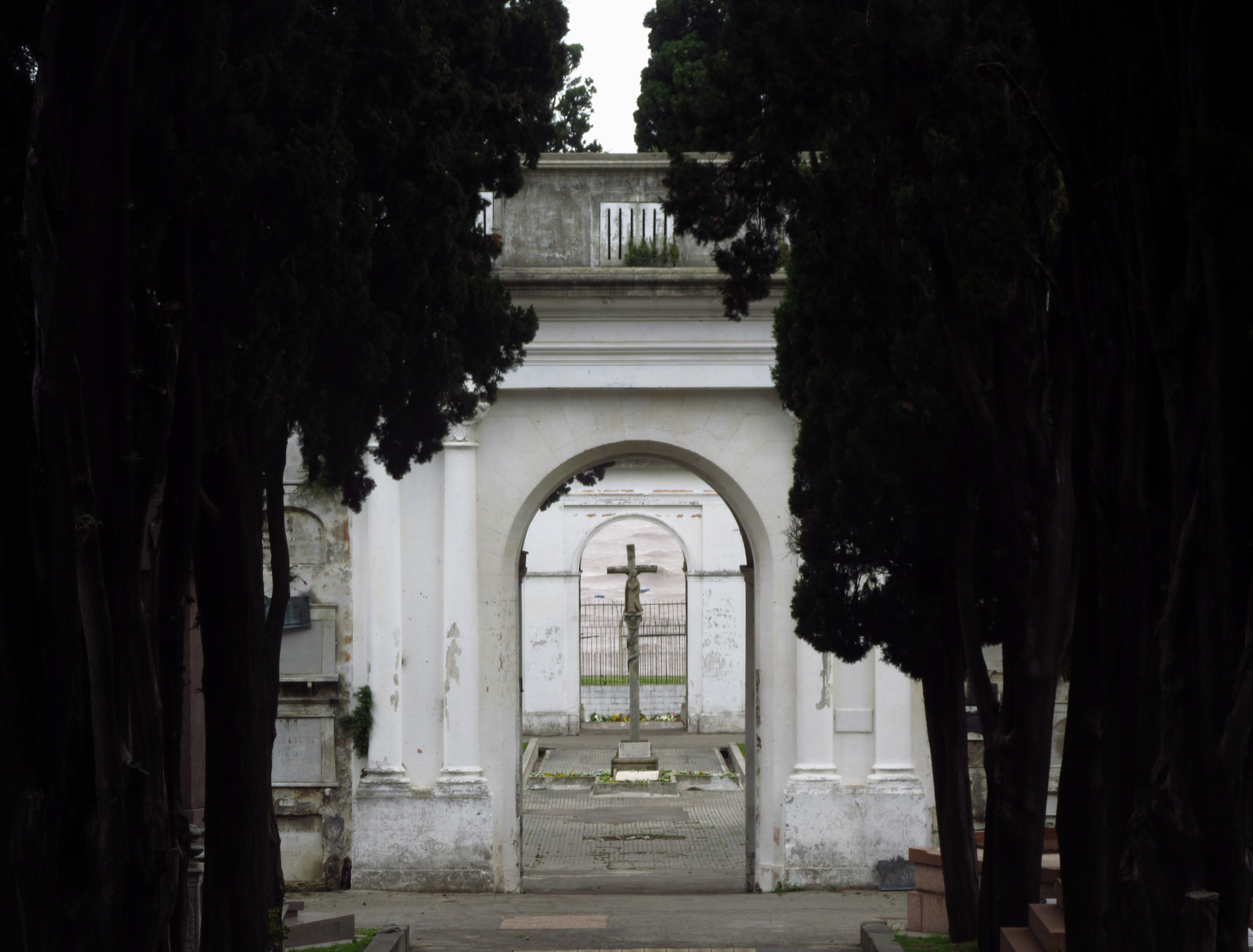
Central Cemetery.

There are five large cemeteries in Montevideo, all administered by the "Fúnebre y Necrópolis" annex of the Intendencia of Montevideo.

The largest cemetery is the Cementerio del Norte, located in the northern-central part of the city. The Central Cemetery (Spanish: Cementerio central), located in Barrio Sur in the southern area of the city, is one of Uruguay's main cemeteries. It was one of the first cemeteries (in contrast to church graveyards) in the country, founded in 1835 at a time when burials were still carried out by the Catholic Church. It is the burial place of many of the most famous Uruguayans, such as Eduardo Acevedo, Delmira Agustini, Luis Batlle Berres, José Batlle y Ordóñez, Juan Manuel Blanes, François Ducasse, father of Comte de Lautréamont (Isidore Ducasse), Luis Alberto de Herrera, Benito Nardone, José Enrique Rodó, and Juan Zorrilla de San Martín.

The other large cemeteries are the Cementerio del Buceo, Cementerio del Cerro, and Cementerio Paso Molino. The British Cemetery Montevideo (Cementerio Británico) is another of the oldest cemeteries in Uruguay, located in the Buceo neighborhood. Many noblemen and eminent persons are buried there. The cemetery originated when the Englishman Thomas Samuel Hood purchased a plot of land in the name of the English residents in 1828. However, in 1884 the government compensated the British by moving the cemetery to Buceo to accommodate city growth. A section of the cemetery, known as British Cemetery Montevideo Soldiers and Sailors, contains the graves of quite a number of sailors of different nationalities, although the majority are of British descent. One United States Marine, Henry de Costa, is buried here.

== Demographics ==
Historical population
Year	Pop.	±% p.a.
1860	58,000	—
1884	164,028	+4.43%
1908	291,465	+2.42%
1963	1,202,890	+2.61%
1975	1,176,049	−0.19%
1985	1,251,511	+0.62%
1996	1,303,182	+0.37%
2004	1,269,552	−0.33%
2011	1,305,082	+0.40%
2023	1,287,452	−0.11%
Source: INE

Montevideo is the most populous city in Uruguay, with 1,302,954 residents in its department as of the 2023 census. The city's population in 2023 was 87.1% White, 10.7% Black, 4,6% Mixed and 0.8% Asian; 5.6% identified themselves as being of other ethnic-racial descent, noting that respondents were allowed to select more than one category.

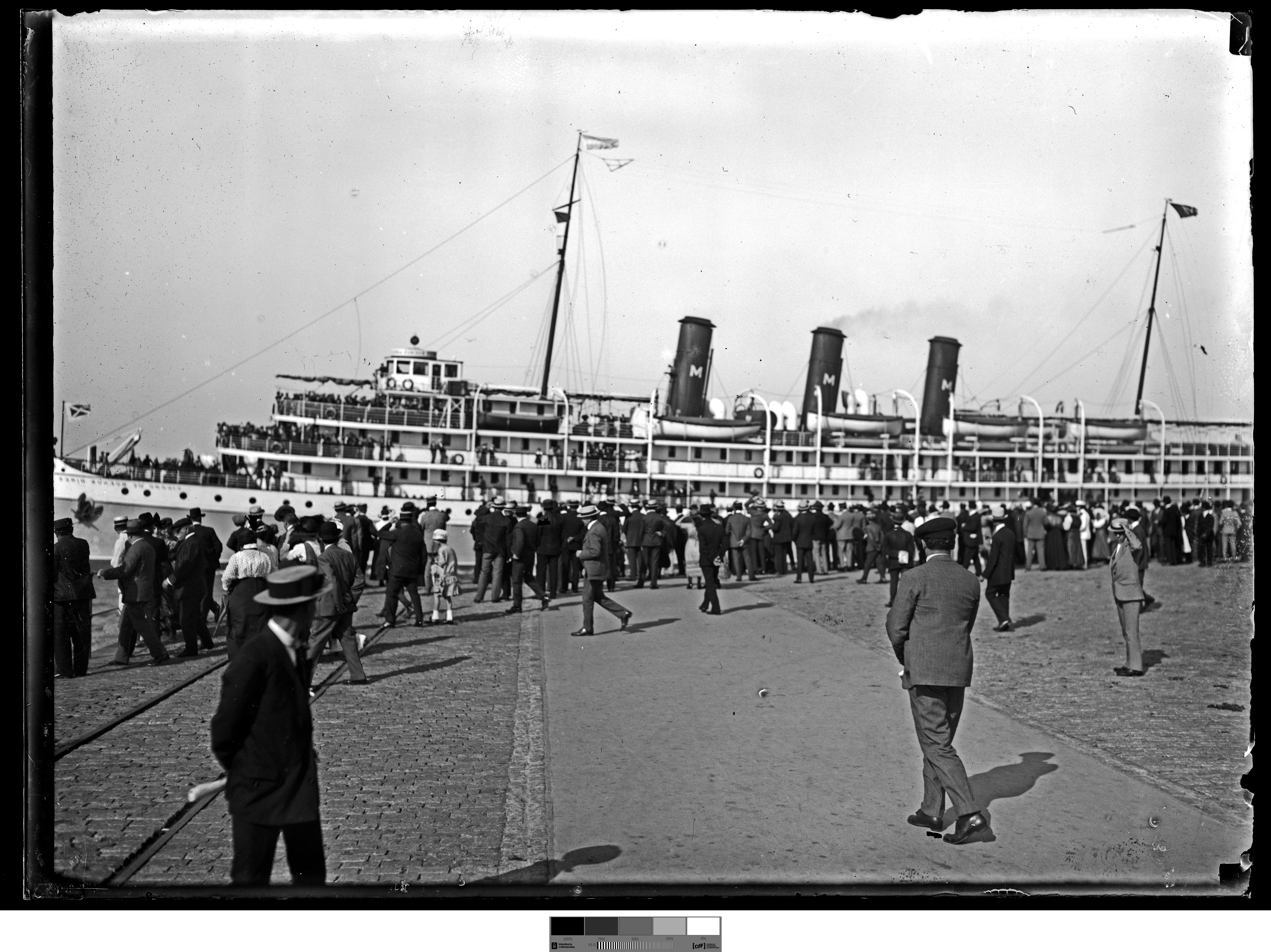
The port of Montevideo served as the primary gateway for immigrants arriving during the significant migratory waves of the 19th and 20th centuries

By 1880, the city's population had quadrupled, mainly because of the great European immigration. In 1908, its population had grown massively to 309,331 inhabitants. Since the mid-20th century, this area has been the main destination for most immigrants arriving in the country, largely due to its port. The majority of these immigrants were Italian and Spanish, who together made up more than 70% of the foreign-born population in the country. Other significant European origins include French, German, Portuguese, Polish, Irish, Croatian, and Lithuanian. Communities of Armenians, Lebanese, and Japanese also took root, along with both Ashkenazi and Sephardic Jewish groups.

There is also an Afro-Uruguayan community in the city, composed of descendants of enslaved people brought over during the colonial era, as well as Afro-Brazilian immigrants who fled to Uruguay following the country's abolition of slavery in 1842—decades before Brazil did the same.

As in the rest of the country, Christianity is the largest religion in Montevideo, with Catholicism as the denomination with the most adherents, followed by Protestantism—particularly Evangelical, Methodist, and Lutheran branches. There is also a significant proportion of irreligious and agnostic individuals.

Approximately 20,000 Jews live in Montevideo, accounting for over 50% of Uruguay's Jewish population—one of the most prominent in Latin America.

== Government and politics ==
=== Intendancy of Montevideo ===
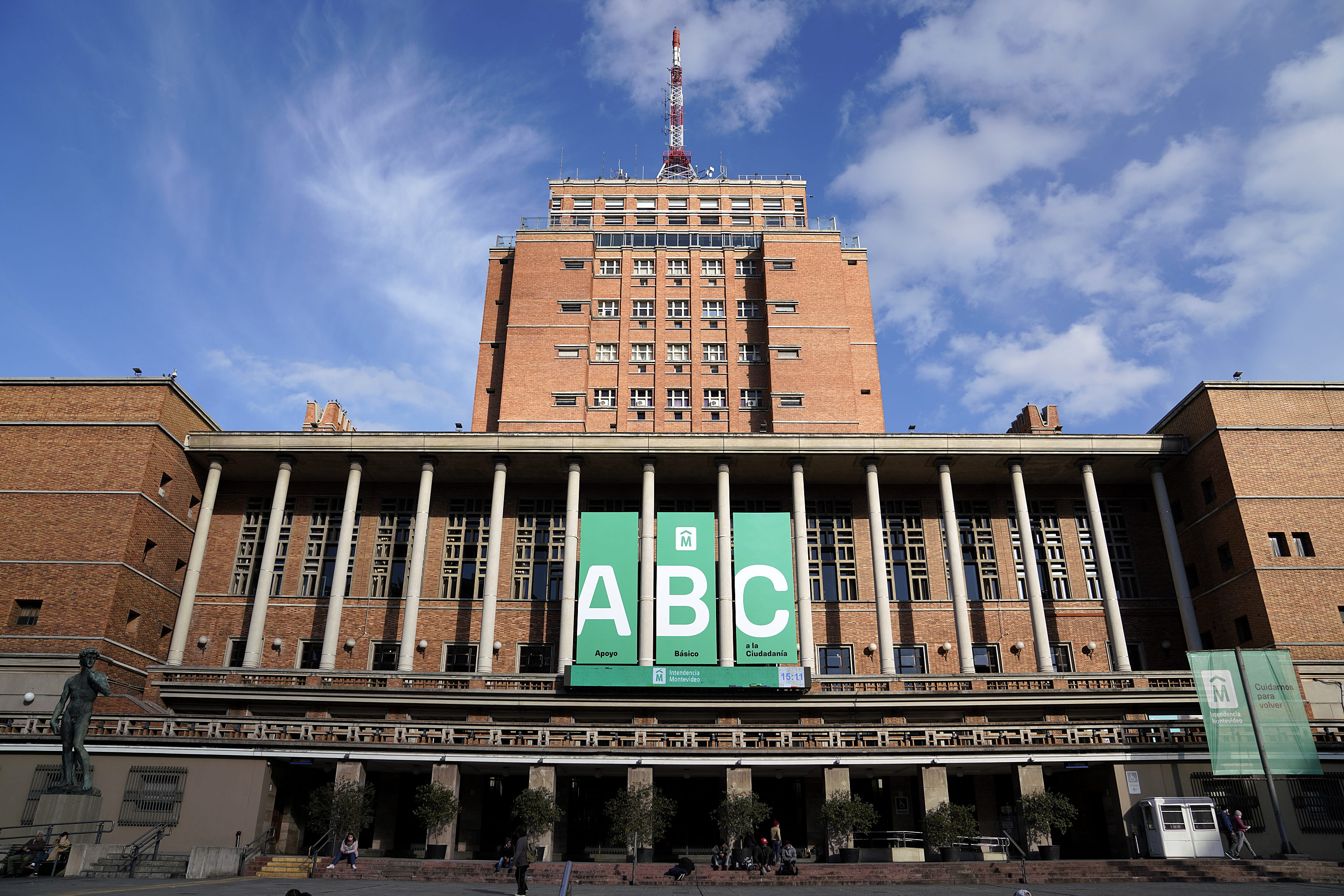
The Palacio Municipal is the City Hall of Montevideo.

The Intendancy of Montevideo was first created by a legal act of 18 December 1908. The municipality's first mayor (1909–1911) was Daniel Muñoz. Municipalities were abolished by the Uruguayan Constitution of 1918, effectively restored during the 1933 military coup of Gabriel Terra, and formally restored by the 1934 Constitution. The 1952 Constitution again decided to abolish the municipalities; it came into effect in February 1955. Municipalities were replaced by departmental councils, which consisted of a collegiate executive board with 7 members from Montevideo and 5 from the interior region. However, municipalities were revived under the 1967 Constitution and have operated continuously since that time.

Since 1990, Montevideo has been partially decentralized into 18 areas; administration and services for each area is provided by its Zonal Community Center (Centro Comunal Zonal, CCZ), which is subordinate to the Intendancy of Montevideo. The boundaries of the municipal districts of Montevideo were created on 12 July 1993, and successively amended on 19 October 1993, 6 June 1994 and 10 November 1994. In 2010, the city CCZ were abolished and eight municipalities were created instead.

The city government of Montevideo performs several functions, including maintaining communications with the public, promoting culture, organizing society, caring for the environment and regulating traffic. The city hall is the Palacio Municipal on 18 de Julio Avenue in the Centro area of Montevideo.

The legislative branch of government, the Junta Departamental, or the Congress of Montevideo, governs the Department of Montevideo. The Junta, composed of 31 unsalaried elected members, is responsible for such things as the freedom of the citizens, the regulation of cultural activities, the naming of streets and public places, and the placement of monuments; it also responds to proposals of the Intendant in various circumstances. Its seat is the architecturally remarkable Casa de Francisco Gómez in Ciudad Vieja.

A 2016 private ranking named Subnational Legislative Online Opening Index measured the data availability in official websites, scoring Montevideo as the second most open district nationally at 17.50 points.

=== Intendants of Montevideo ===
1. Daniel Muñoz (1909–1911)
2. Ramón V. Benzano (1911–1914)
3. Juan M. Aubriot (1914–1914)
4. Santiago Rivas (1914–1915)
5. Francisco Accinelli (1915–1919)
6. Alberto Dagnino (1933–1937)
7. Luis Alberto Zanzi (1937–1938)
8. Horacio Acosta y Lara (1938–1942)
9. Benigno Paiva (1942–1942)
10. Pedro Onetti (1942–1943)
11. Juan Pedro Fabini (1943–1947)
12. Andrés Martínez Trueba (1947–1948)
13. Álvaro Correa Moreno (1950–1951)
14. Germán Barbato (1951–1954)
15. Armando Malet (1954–1955)
16. Board members of the Concejo Departamental (1955–1967)
17. Glauco Segovia (1967–1967)
18. Carlos Bartolomé Herrera (1967–1969)
19. Oscar Víctor Rachetti (1969–1971)
20. E. Mario Peyrot (1971–1972)
21. Oscar Víctor Rachetti (1972–1983)
22. Juan Carlos Payssé (1983–1985)
23. Aquiles R. Lanza (1985–1985)
24. Julio Iglesias Álvarez (1985–1986)
25. Eduardo Fabini Jiménez (1989–1990)
26. Tabaré Vázquez (1990–1994)
27. Tabaré González (1994–1995)
28. Mariano Arana (1995–2000 / 2000–2005)
29. Adolfo Pérez Piera (2005)
30. Ricardo Ehrlich (2005–2010)
31. Hyara Rodríguez (2010)
32. Ana Olivera (2010–2015)
33. Daniel Martínez (2015–2019)
34. Christian di Candia (2019–2020)
35. Carolina Cosse (2020-2024)
36. Mauricio Zunino (2024-2025)
37. Mario Bergara (2025-Incumbent)

== Culture ==
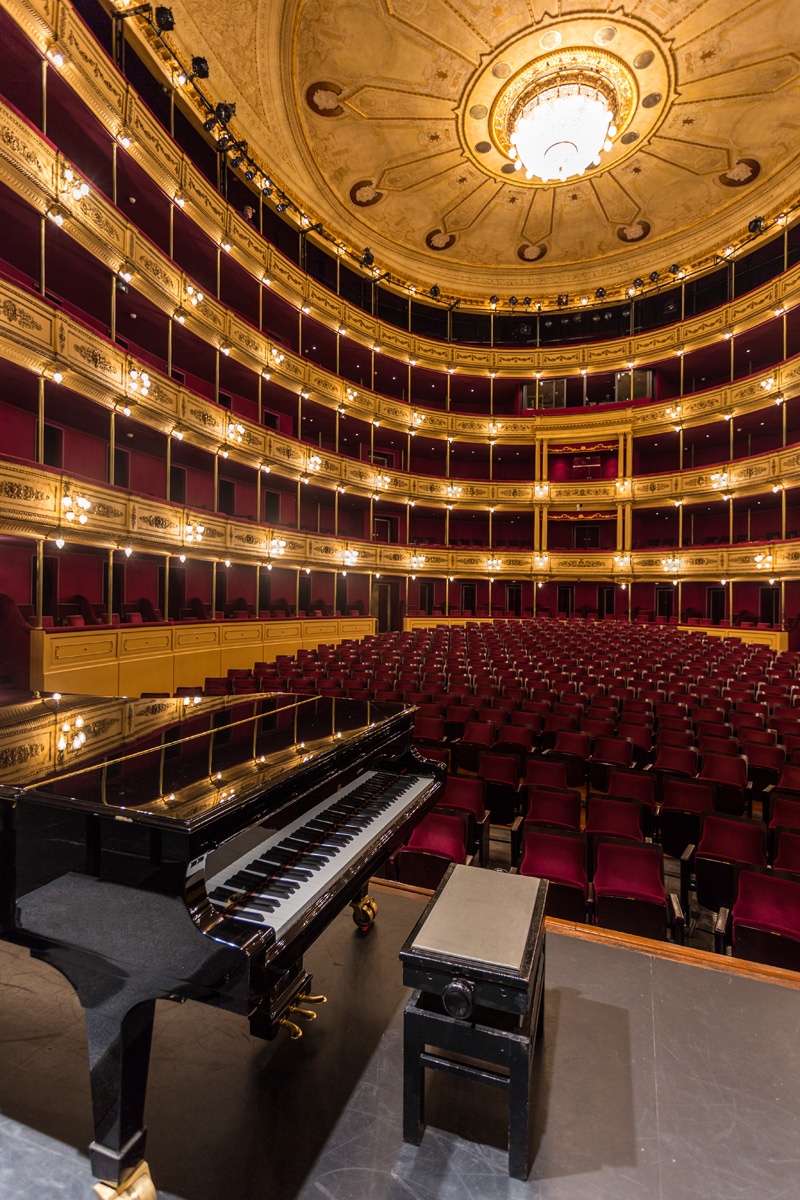
Solis Theatre in Montevideo

In recent years Montevideo nightlife has moved to Parque Rodó, where a large concentration of buildings cater for the recreational interests of young people during the night time. Under a presidential decree which went into effect on 1 March 2006, smoking is prohibited in any public place with roofing, and there is a prohibition on the sale of alcohol in certain businesses from 21.00 to 9.00.

Montevideo has been part of the UNESCO Creative Cities Network in the area of Literature since December 2015.

=== The arts ===
Montevideo has a very rich architectural heritage and a number of writers, artists, and musicians. Uruguayan tango is a unique form of dance that originated in the neighborhoods of Montevideo towards the end of the 1800s. Tango, candombe and murga are the three main styles of music in this city. The city is also the center of the cinema of Uruguay, which includes commercial, documentary and experimental films. There are two movie theater companies running seven cinemas, around ten independent ones and four art film cinemas in the city. The theater of Uruguay is admired inside and outside Uruguayan borders. The Solís Theatre is the most prominent theater in Uruguay and the oldest in South America. There are several notable theatrical companies and thousands of professional actors and amateurs. Montevideo playwrights produce dozens of works each year; of major note are Mauricio Rosencof, Ana Magnabosco and Ricardo Prieto.

==== Visual arts ====
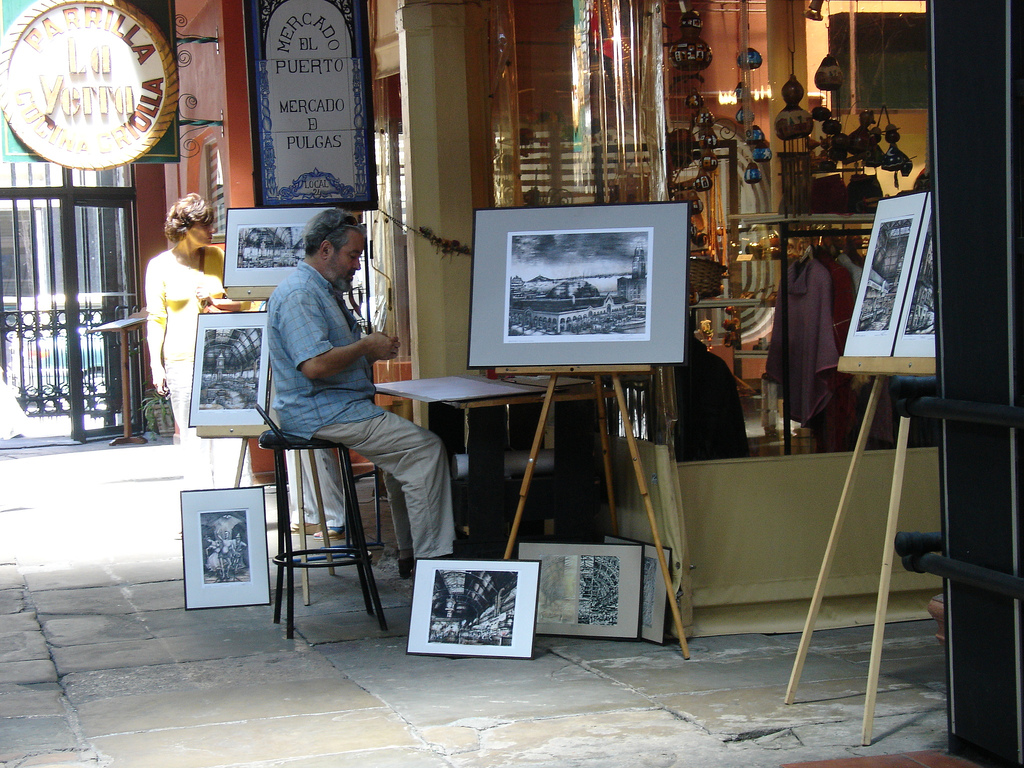
Painter shop in Montevideo

The daily newspaper El País sponsors the Virtual Museum of Contemporary Uruguayan Art. The director and curator of the Museum presents exhibitions in "virtual spaces, supplemented by information, biographies, texts in English and Spanish".

In the early 1970s (1973, to be particular) when the military junta took over power in Uruguay, art suffered in Montevideo. The art studios went into protest mode, with Rimer Cardillo, one of the country's leading artists, making the National Institute of Fine Arts, Montevideo a "hotbed of resistance". This resulted in the military junta coming down heavily on artists by closing the Fine Art Institute and carting away all the presses and other studio equipment. Consequently, the learning of fine arts was only in private studios run by people who had been let out of jail, in works of printing and on paper and also painting and sculpture. It resumed much later.

==== Literature ====
The first public library in Montevideo was formed by the initial donation of the private library of Father José Manuel Pérez Castellano, who died in 1815. Its promoter, director and organizer was Father Dámaso Antonio Larrañaga, who also made a considerable donation along with donations from José Raimundo Guerra, as well as others from the Convent of San Francisco in Salta. In 1816 its stock was 5,000 volumes. The building of the National Library of Uruguay (Biblioteca Pública de Uruguay) was designed by Luis Crespi in the Neoclassical style and occupies an area of 4,000 square meters (43,000 sq ft). Construction began in 1926 and it was inaugurated in 1964. Its collection amounts to 900,000 volumes.

==== Authors ====
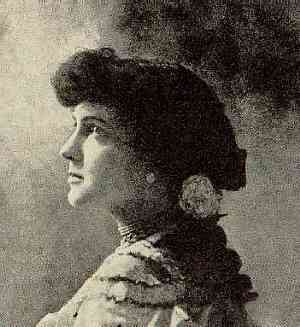
The poet Delmira Agustini.

The city has a long and rich literary tradition. Although Uruguayan literature is not limited to the authors of the capital (Horacio Quiroga was born in Salto and Mario Benedetti in Paso de los Toros, for instance), Montevideo has been and is the center of the editorial and creative activity of literature.

In 1900, the city had a remarkable group of writers, including José Enrique Rodó, Carlos Vaz Ferreira, Julio Herrera y Reissig, Delmira Agustini and Felisberto Hernández. Montevideo was then called the "Atenas del Plata" or the "Athens of the Rio de la Plata".

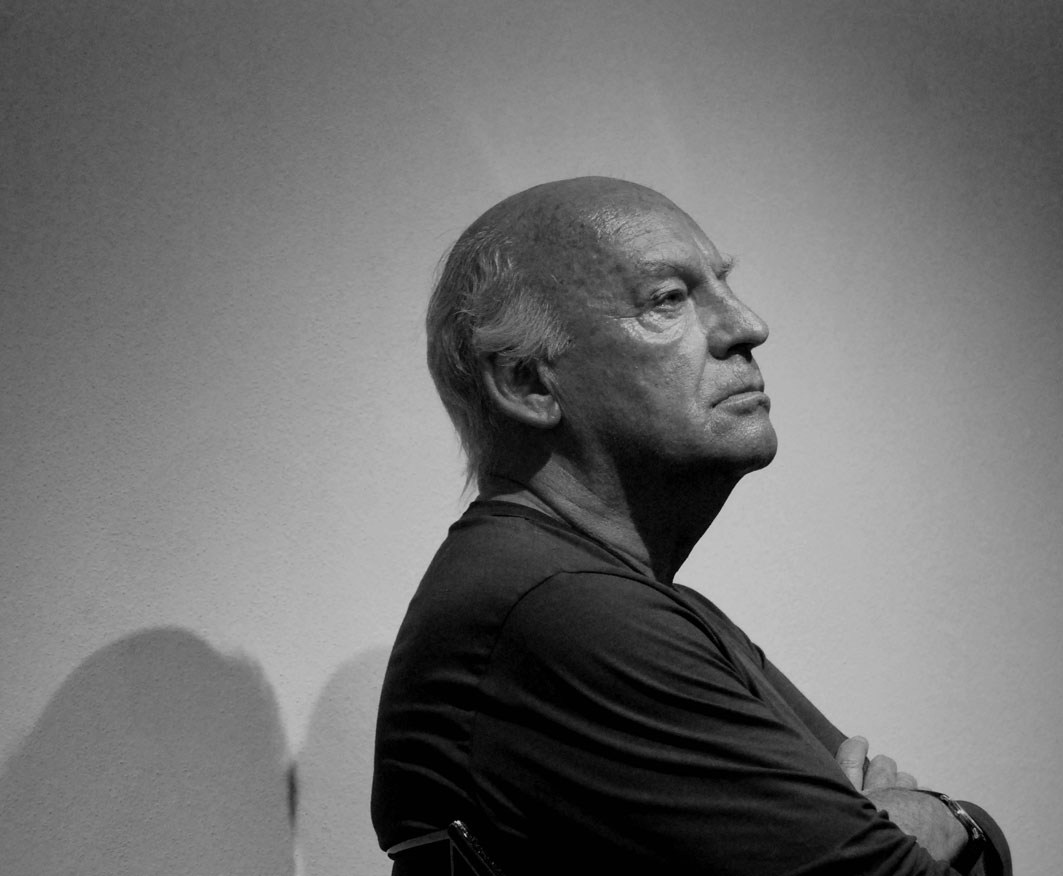
The writer Eduardo Galeano.

Among the outstanding authors of Montevideo of the second half of the 20th century are Juan Carlos Onetti, Antonio Larreta, Eduardo Galeano, Marosa di Giorgio and Cristina Peri Rossi.

A new generation of writers has become known internationally in recent years. These include Eduardo Espina (essayist and poet), Fernando Butazzoni (novelist), Rafael Courtoisie (poet) and Hugo Burel (short story writer and novelist).

==== Music ====
In Montevideo, as throughout the Rio de Plata region, the most popular forms of music are tango, milonga and vals criollo. Many notable songs originated in Montevideo including "El Tango supremo", "La Cumparsita", "La Milonga", "La Puñalada" and "Desde el Alma", composed by notable Montevideo musicians such as Gerardo Matos Rodríguez, Pintín Castellanos and Rosita Melo. Tango is deeply ingrained in the cultural life of the city and is the theme for many of the bars and restaurants in the city. 20th century composers like three-time Grammy nominated Miguel del Aguila have taken Uruguayan tango to international classical music audiences. Fun Fun' Bar, established in 1935, is one of the most important places for tango in Uruguay as is El Farolito, located in the old part of the city and Joventango, Café Las Musas, Garufa and Vieja Viola. The city is also home to the Montevideo Jazz Festival and has the Bancaria Jazz Club bar catering for jazz enthusiasts.

=== Cuisine ===
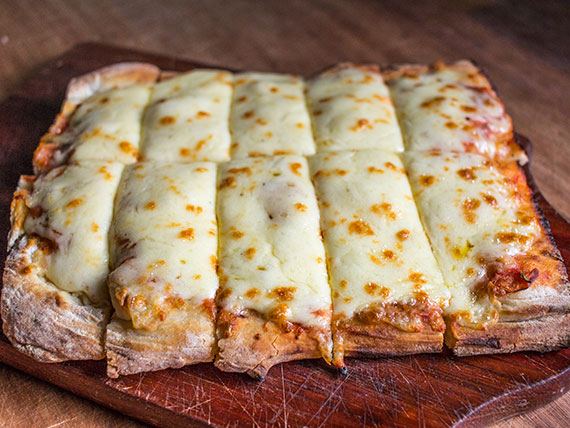
"A la piedra" mozzarella pizza

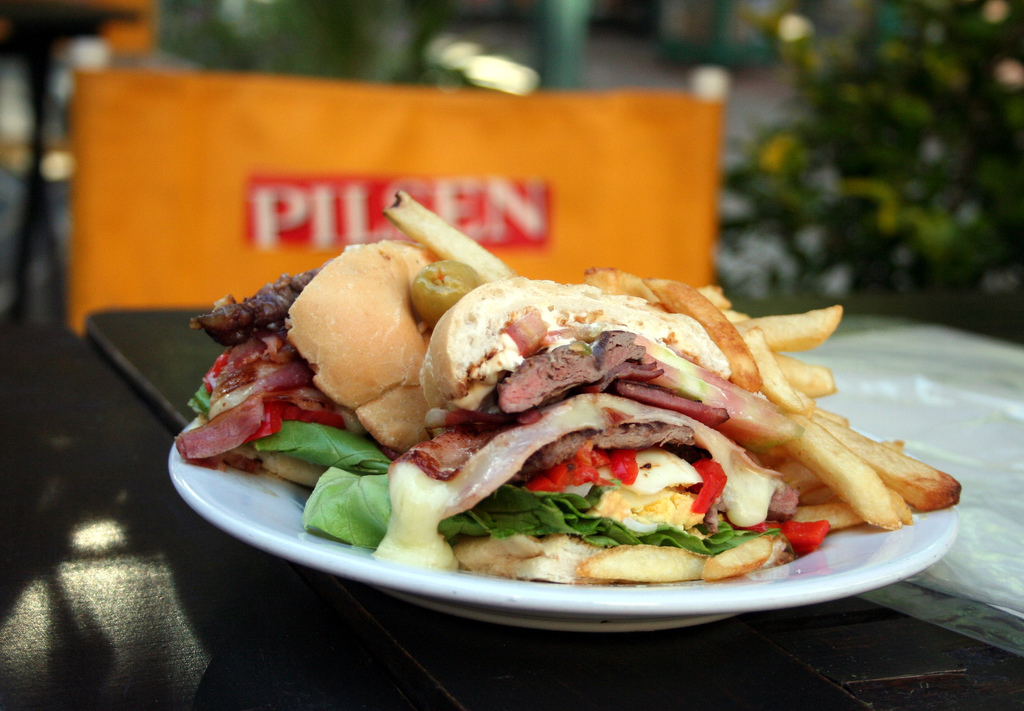
Chivito, Uruguay's national dish

The cuisine of Montevideo largely reflects that of the rest of the country, which is shaped by the strong influence of Italian and Spanish immigration. This heritage is evident in the widespread consumption of pasta, pizza, bread, and baked goods, as well as in the prominent role of grilled meats, particularly asado. Cafés and bars are central to daily life, serving as both dining venues and social spaces rooted in the city’s local tradition.

A torta frita is a widely consumed circular pan-fried cake, typically made from wheat flour, yeast, water, and sugar or salt, with a small cut in the center to aid cooking. Since it is traditional to eat Italian gnocchi on the 29th of each month in Uruguay, this dish is specially served on that day in most of the city’s restaurants. Additionally, the chivito—a sandwich made with sliced beefsteak—is widely popular. Equally popular is the “a la piedra” style pizza, baked in a wood-fired oven and served in rectangular slices. The city is home to a large number of traditional pizzerias and classic neighborhood bars.

The city has also several historic markets that today serve as gastronomic and cultural hubs, including the Mercado del Puerto, the Mercado de la Abundancia, and the Mercado Agrícola. While originally conceived as traditional marketplaces, these structures now operate primarily as food halls, offering both Uruguayan and international cuisines.

=== Notable people ===
- Delmira Agustini (writer)
- Miguel del Aguila (composer)
- Julio Albino (former footballer)
- Marcelina Almeida (writer)
- Victoria Alonsoperez (engineer)
- Fede Álvarez (film director)
- Odile Baron Supervielle (writer, including journalist)
- Luis Batlle Berres (president of Uruguay)
- José Batlle y Ordóñez (president of Uruguay)
- Mario Benedetti (writer)
- Roy Berocay (children's writer, journalist, musician)
- Juan Manuel Blanes (artist)
- Baltasar Brum (statesman)
- Raúl Javiel Cabrera (painter)
- Graciela Cánepa (actress, television presenter)
- Rodrigo Casagrande (former footballer)
- Manuel Ceferino Oribe (politician)
- Gonzalo Curbelo (former footballer)
- Eladio Dieste (civil engineer)
- Jorge Drexler (actor, musician)
- Esteban Echeverría (Argentine writer)
- Claudio Elías (former footballer)
- Edda Fabbri (writer)
- Marcel Felder (tennis player)
- Julio Ferrón (former footballer)
- Diego Forlán (footballer manager, former footballer)
- Enzo Francescoli (former footballer)
- José Gervasio Artigas (revolutionary)
- Andrea Ghidone (vedette, model, dancer, actress)
- Felisberto Hernández (writer)
- Julio Herrera y Reissig (poet)
- Juana de Ibarbourou (poet)
- Pedro Ipuche Riva (classical composer)
- Jules Laforgue (French poet)
- Rolando Laguarda Trías (historian)
- Lautréamont, Comte de. Isidore Ducasse (French poet)
- Rosita Melo (composer, poet)
- Ronald Melzer (film critic, sports journalist)
- Martin Mendez (musician (bassist for the Swedish progressive-metal band Opeth))
- Ricardo Moller (former footballer)
- Paolo Montero (football mamager, former footballer)
- Amado Nervo (Mexican educator, journalist, poet)
- Juan Carlos Onetti (writer)
- Natalia Oreiro (actress, singer)
- Nando Parrado (writer)
- Maxi Pereira (former footballer)
- Cristina Peri Rossi (writer)
- Gustavo Perla (former footballer)
- Pedro Piedrabuena (billiard player)
- Olga Piria (painter and goldsmith)
- Jorge Plachot (former footballer)
- Arturo C. Porzecanski (Wall Street economist)
- Teresa Porzecanski (anthropologist and writer)
- Rubén Rada (musician)
- Andy Ram (Israeli tennis player)
- Álvaro Recoba (football coach, former footballer)
- José Enrique Rodó (philosopher)
- Rubén Rodríguez (former footballer)
- Mariano Rubbo (footballer)
- Gabe Saporta (musician, entrepreneur)
- Carlos Savio (former footballer)
- Erwin Schrott (operatic bass-baritone)
- José Serebrier (conductor, composer)
- Jules Supervielle (French autobiographer, poet, short-story writer)
- Joaquín Torres-García (painter)
- Obdulio Varela (1917–1996) (footballer)
- Tabaré Vázquez (president of Uruguay)
- Santiago Vecino (artist, including illustrator)
- Helen Velando (children's writer)
- Margarita Xirgu (Spanish actress)
- China Zorrilla (actress)
- José Luis Zorrilla de San Martín (sculptor)
- Juan Zorrilla de San Martín (poet)
- Elena Zuasti (stage actress)

=== Recreation ===
==== Museums ====
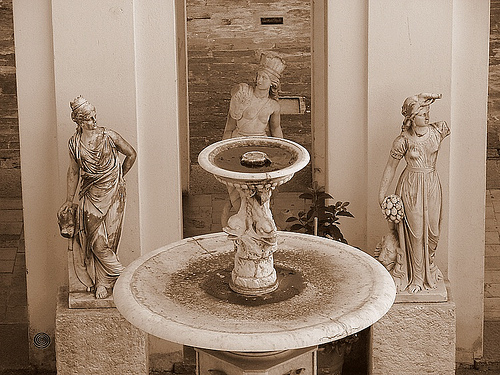
Fountain in the entry of the Cabildo

The Centro Cultural de España, as well as Asturian and cultural centers, testify to Montevideo's considerable Spanish heritage. Montevideo also has important museums including Museo Torres García, Museo José Gurvich, Museo Nacional de Artes Visuales and Museo Juan Manuel Blanes etc.

The Montevideo Cabildo was the seat of government during the colonial times of the Viceroyalty of the Río de la Plata. It is located in front of Constitution Square, in Ciudad Vieja. Built between 1804 and 1869 in Neoclassical style, with a series of Doric and Ionic columns, it became a National Heritage Site in 1975. In 1958, the Municipal Historic Museum and Archive was inaugurated here. It features three permanent city museum exhibitions, as well as temporary art exhibitions, cultural events, seminars, symposiums and forums.

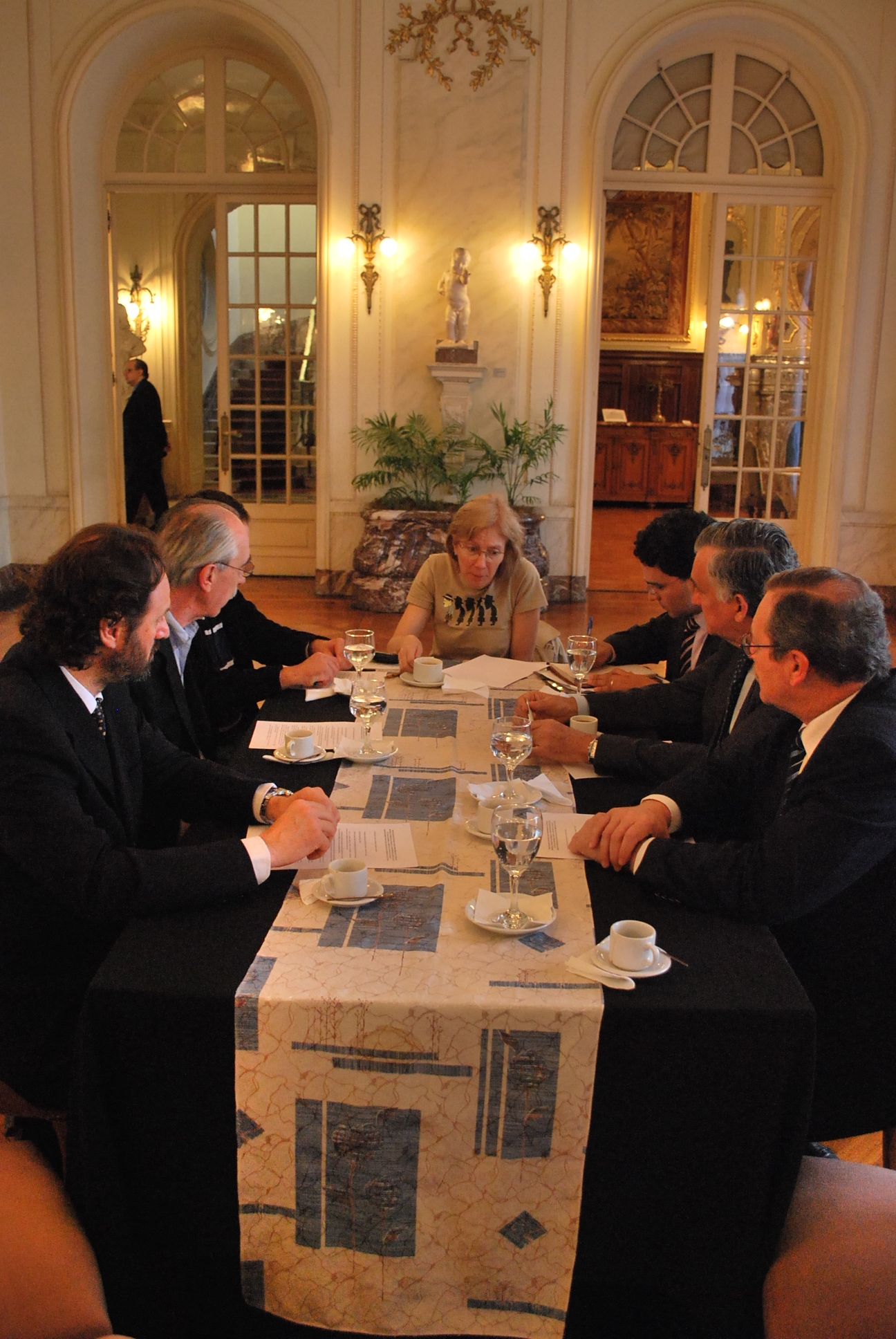
Uruguayan officials conversing at a meeting at the Palacio Taranco, 6 November 2010

The Palacio Taranco is located in front of the Plaza Zabala, in the heart of Ciudad Vieja. It was erected in the early 20th century as the residence of the Ortiz Taranco brothers on the ruins of Montevideo's first theater (of 1793), during a period in which the architectural style was influenced by French architecture. The palace was designed by French architects Charles Louis Girault and Jules-Léon Chifflot who also designed the Petit Palais and the Arc de Triomphe in Paris. It passed to the city from the heirs of the Tarancos in 1943, along with its precious collection of Uruguayan furniture and draperies and was deemed by the city as an ideal place for a museum; in 1972 it became the Museum of Decorative Arts of Montevideo and in 1975 it became a National Heritage Site. The Decorative Arts Museum has an important collection of European paintings and decorative arts, ancient Greek and Roman art and Islamic ceramics of the 10th–18th century from the area of present-day Iran. The palace is often used as a meeting place by the Uruguayan government.

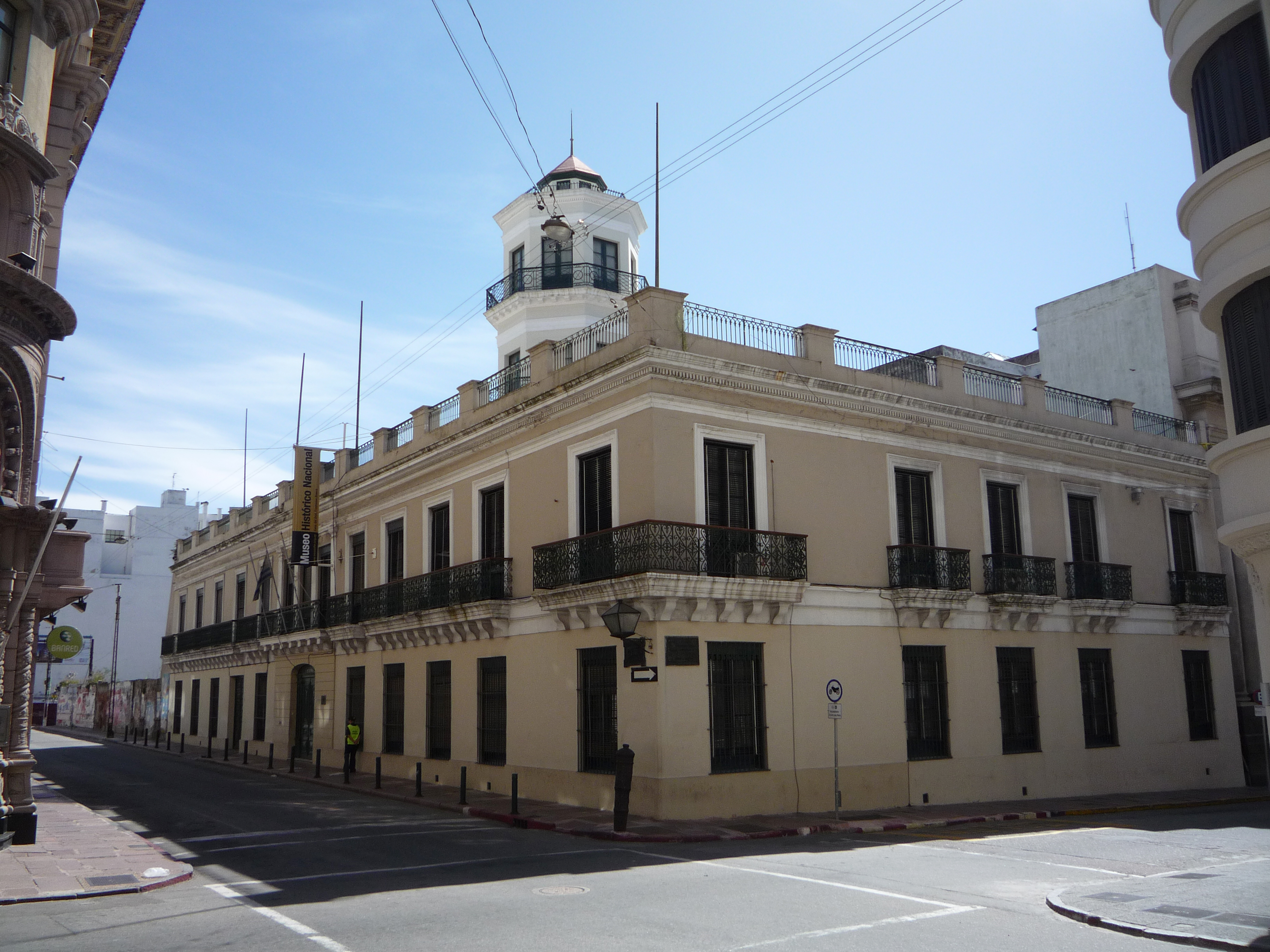
Museo Historico Nacional de Montevideo

The National History Museum of Montevideo is located in the historical residence of General Fructuoso Rivera. It exhibits artifacts related to the history of Uruguay. In a process begun in 1998, the National Museum of Natural History (1837) and the National Museum of Anthropology (1981), merged in 2001, becoming the National Museum of Natural History and Anthropology. In July 2009, the two institutions again became independent. The Historical Museum has annexed eight historical houses in the city, five of which are located in the Ciudad Vieja. One of them, on the same block with the main building, is the historic residence of Antonio Montero, which houses the Museo Romantico. Also nearby is the Museo Casa de José Garibaldi where Giuseppe Garibaldi lived in the 1840s while participating in the Uruguayan Civil War.

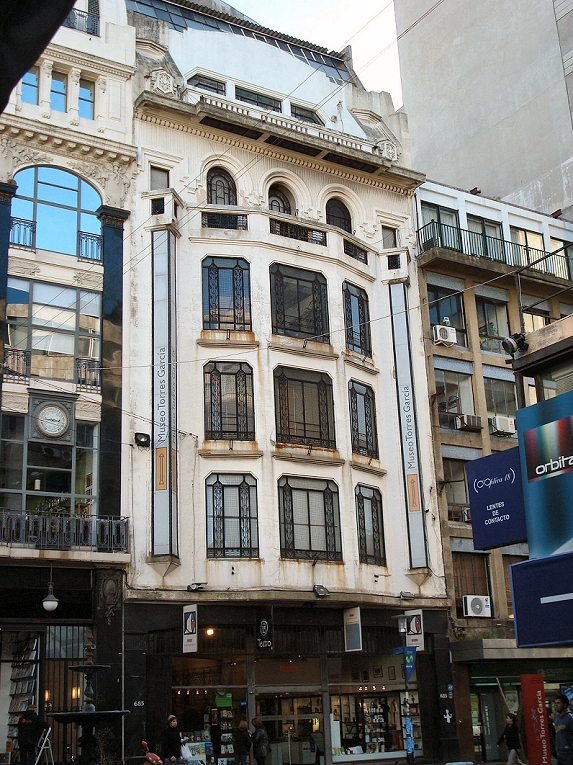
Museo Torres García

The Museo Torres García is located in the Old Town, and exhibits Joaquín Torres García's unusual portraits of historical icons and cubist paintings akin to those of Picasso and Braque. The museum was established by Manolita Piña Torres, the widow of Torres Garcia, after his death in 1949. She also set up the García Torres Foundation, a private non-profit organization that organizes the paintings, drawings, original writings, archives, objects and furniture designed by the painter as well as the photographs, magazines and publications related to him.

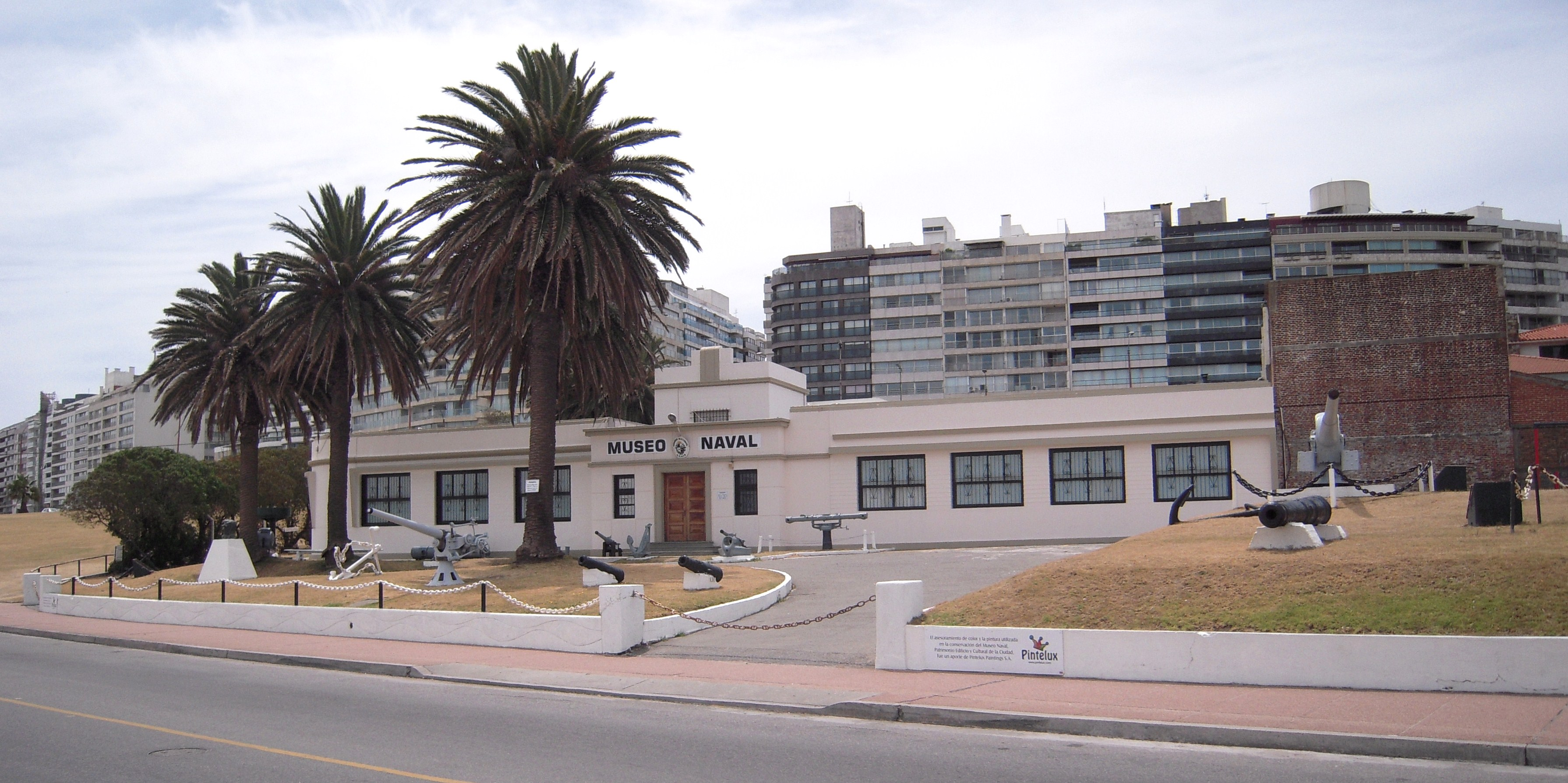
Museo Naval de Montevideo

There are several other important art museums in Montevideo. The Centro de Fotografía de Montevideo (CdF) is a museum, archive, and gallery for historic and contemporary photography with twelve outdoor exhibition spaces in various Montevideo neighborhoods as well as four galleries in its downtown headquarters. The National Museum of Visual Arts in Parque Rodó has Uruguay's largest collection of paintings. The Juan Manuel Blanes Museum was founded in 1930, the 100th anniversary of the first Constitution of Uruguay, significant with regard to the fact that Juan Manuel Blanes painted Uruguayan patriotic themes. In the back of the museum is a Japanese Garden with a pond where there are over a hundred carp. The Museo de Historia del Arte, located in the Palacio Municipal, features replicas of ancient monuments and exhibits a varied collection of artifacts from Egypt, Mesopotamia, Persia, Greece, Rome and Native American cultures including local finds of the pre-Columbian period. The Museo Municipal Precolombino y Colonial, in the Ciudad Vieja, has preserved collections of the archeological finds from excavations carried out by Uruguayan archeologist Antonio Taddei. These antiquaries are exhibits of pre-Columbian art of Latin America, painting and sculpture from the 17th and 18th century mostly from Mexico, Peru and Brazil. The Museo de Arte Contempo has small exhibits of modern Uruguayan painting and sculpture.

There are also other types of museums in the city. The Museo del Gaucho y de la Moneda, located in the Centro, has distinctive displays of the historical culture of Uruguay's gauchos, their horse gear, silver work and mate (tea), gourds, and bombillas (drinking straws) in odd designs. The Museo Naval, is located on the eastern waterfront in Buceo and offers exhibits depicting the maritime history of Uruguay. The Museo del Automóvil, belonging to the Automobile Club of Uruguay, has a rich collection of vintage cars which includes a 1910 Hupmobile. The Museo y Parque Fernando García in Carrasco, a transport and automobile museum, includes old horse carriages and some early automobiles. The Castillo Pittamiglio, with an unusual façade, highlights the eccentric legacy of Humberto Pittamiglio, local alchemist and architect.

==== Festivals ====
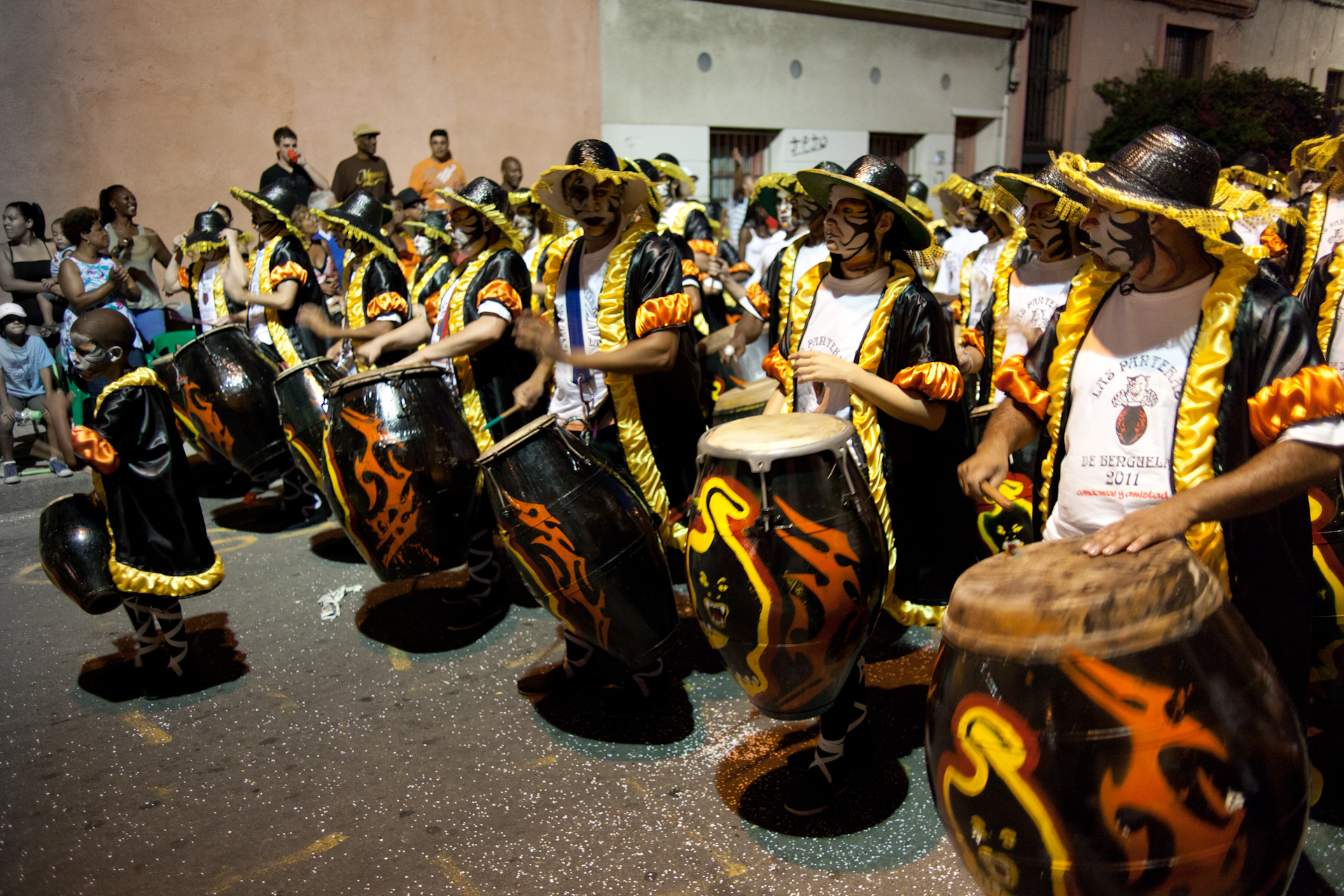
Carnival drummers.

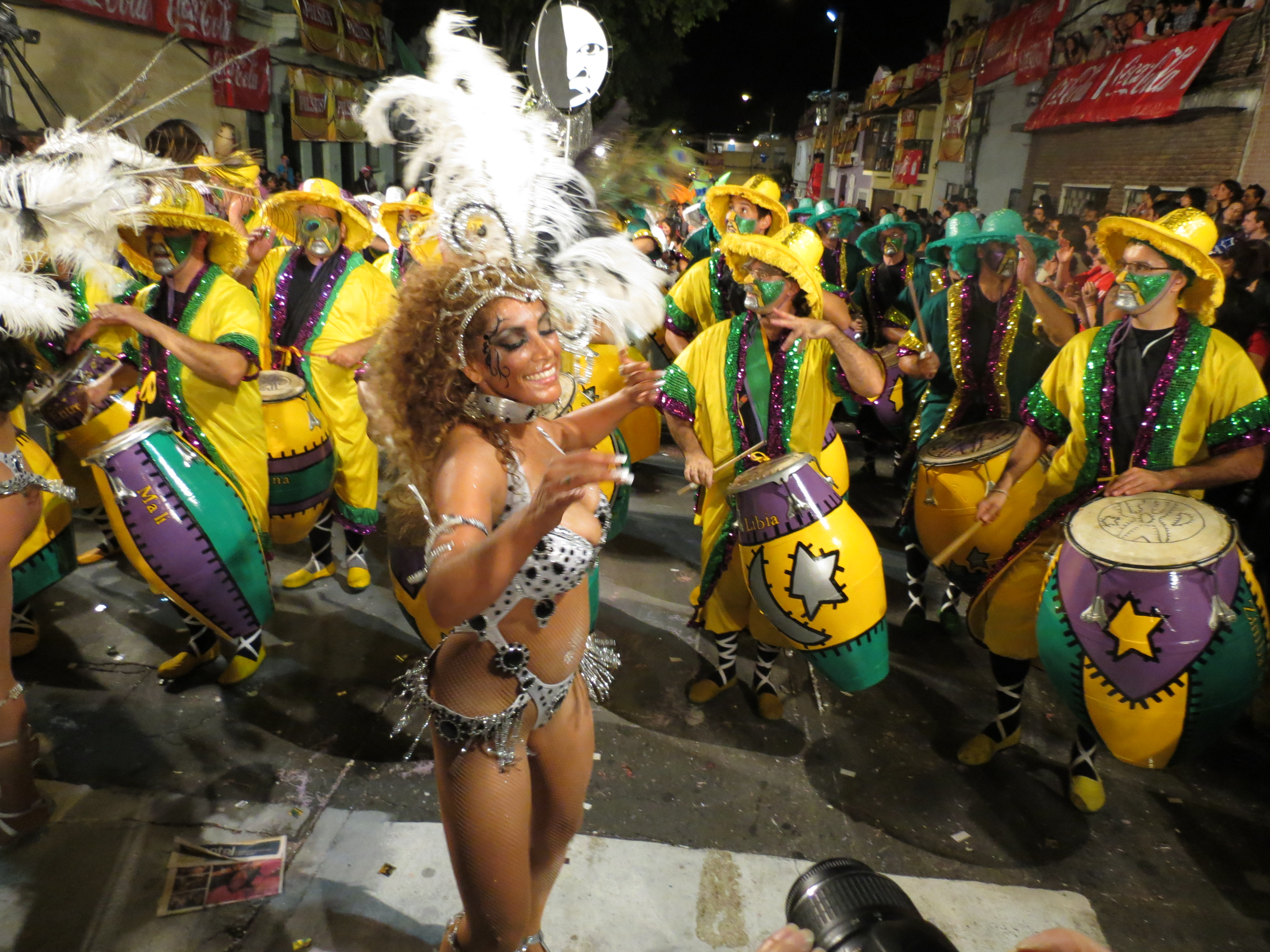
Carnival dancer and drummers.

As the capital of Uruguay, Montevideo is home to a number of festivals and carnivals including a Gaucho festival when people ride through the streets on horseback in traditional gaucho gear. The major annual festival is the annual Montevideo Carnival which is part of the national festival of Carnival Week, celebrated throughout Uruguay, with central activities in the capital, Montevideo. Officially, the public holiday lasts for two days on Carnival Monday and Shrove Tuesday preceding Ash Wednesday, but due to the prominence of the festival, most shops and businesses close for the entire week. During carnival there are many open-air stage performances and competitions and the streets and houses are vibrantly decorated. "Tablados" or popular scenes, both fixed and movable, are erected in the whole city. Notable displays include "Desfile de las Llamadas" ("Parade of the Calls"), which is a grand united parade held on the south part of downtown, where it used to be a common ritual back in the early 20th century. Due to the scale of the festival, preparation begins as early as December with an election of the "zonal beauty queens" to appear in the carnival.

==== Sports ====
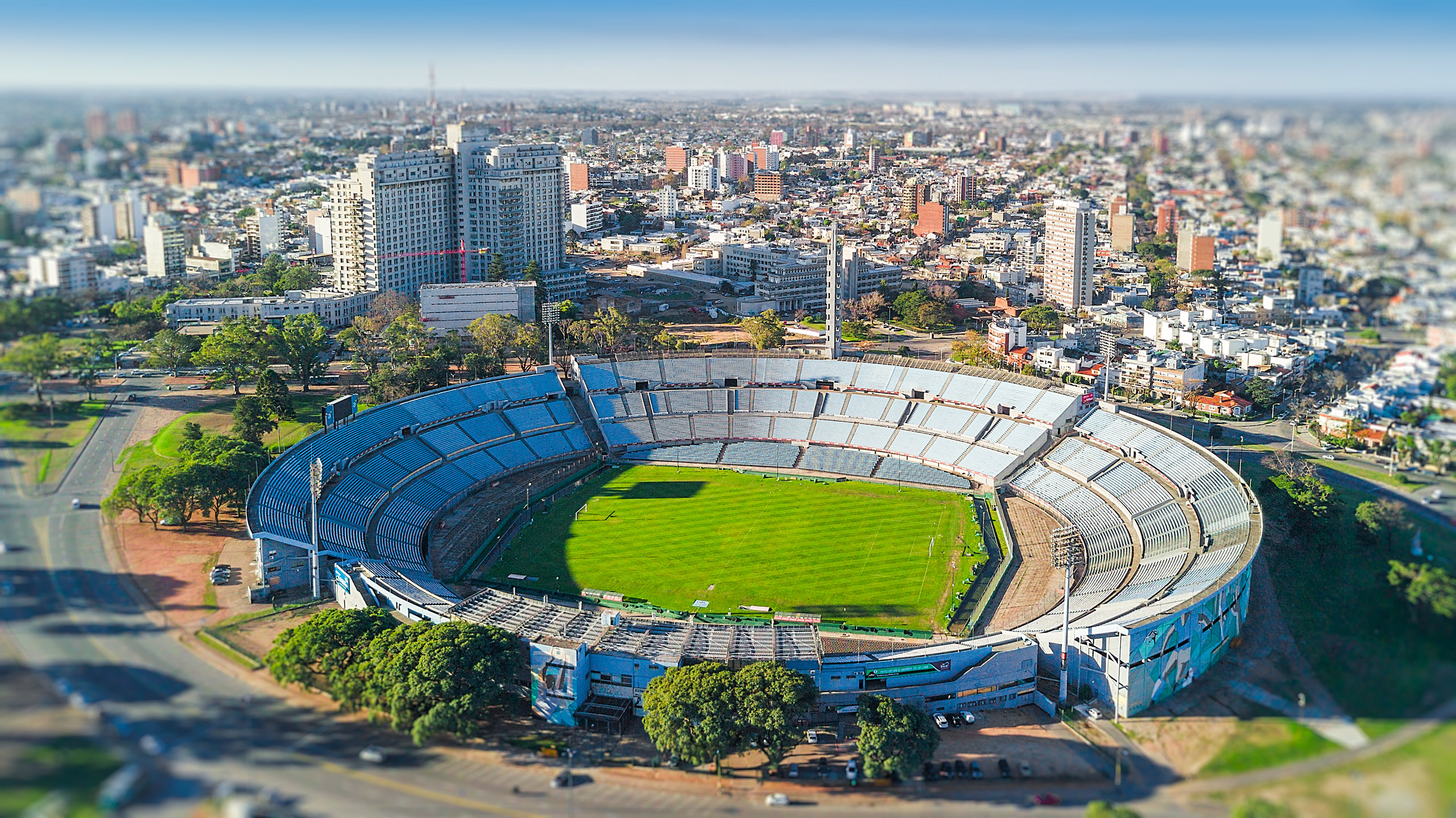
Estadio Centenario

Estadio Centenario, the national football stadium in Parque Batlle, was opened in 1930 for the first World Cup, as well as to commemorate the centennial of Uruguay's first constitution. In this World Cup, Uruguay won the title game against Argentina by 4 goals to 2. The stadium has 70,000 seats. It is listed by FIFA as one of the football world's classic stadiums, along with Maracanã, Wembley Stadium, San Siro, Estadio Azteca, and Santiago Bernabéu Stadium. A museum located within the football stadium has exhibits of memorabilia from Uruguay's 1930 and 1950 World Cup championships. Museum tickets give access to the stadium, stands, locker rooms and playing field.

Between 1935 and 1938, the athletics track and the municipal velodrome were completed within Parque Batlle. The Tabaré Athletic Club is occasionally made over as a carnival theater using impermanent materials.

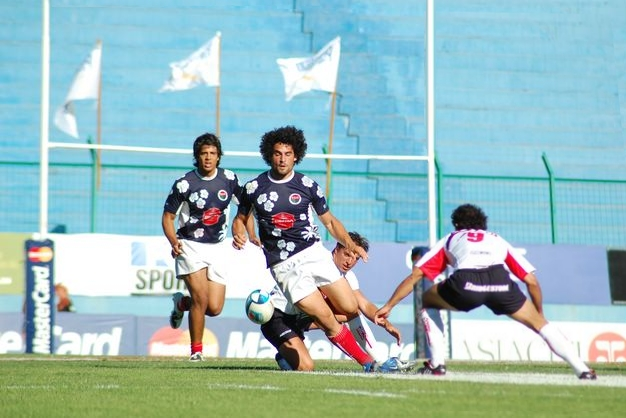
Rugby in Montevideo

Today the vast majority of teams in the Primera División and Segunda División come from Montevideo, including Nacional, Peñarol, Central Español, Cerrito, Cerro, Danubio, Defensor Sporting, Atlético Fénix, Liverpool, Wanderers, Racing, River Plate, Club Atlético Torque, Boston River and Rampla Juniors.

Besides Estadio Centenario, other stadiums include Gran Parque Central, Estadio Campeón del Siglo, Belvedere, Complejo Rentistas, Jardines del Hipódromo, José Pedro Damiani, "La Bombonera", Luis Franzini, Luis Tróccoli and the park stadiums of Abraham Paladino, Alfredo Víctor Viera, Omar Saroldi, José Nasazzi, Osvaldo Roberto, Maracaná and Palermo.

The city has a tradition as host of major international basketball tournaments including the official 1967 FIBA World Cup and the 1988, 1997 and 2017 editions of the official Americas Basketball Championship.

The Uruguayan Basketball League is headquartered in Montevideo and most of its teams are from the city, including Defensor Sporting, Biguá, Atlético Aguada, Goes, Malvín, Unión Atlética, and Trouville. Montevideo is also a center of rugby; equestrianism, which regained importance in Montevideo after the Maroñas Racecourse reopened; golf, with the Club de Punta Carretas; and yachting, with the Puerto del Buceo, an ideal place to moor yachts. The Golf Club of Punta Carretas was founded in 1894 covers all the area encircled by the west side of Bulevar Artigas, the Rambla (Montevideo's promenade) and the Parque Rodó (Fun Fair).

=== Religion ===
The religion with most followers in Montevideo is Roman Catholicism and has been so since the foundation of the city. The Roman Catholic Archdiocese of Montevideo was created as the Apostolic Vicariate of Montevideo in 1830. The vicariate was promoted to the Diocese of Montevideo on 13 July 1878. Pope Leo XIII elevated it to the rank of a metropolitan archdiocese on 14 April 1897. The new archdiocese became the Metropolitan of the suffragan sees of Canelones, Florida, Maldonado–Punta del Este, Melo, Mercedes, Minas, Salto, San José de Mayo, Tacuarembó.

Montevideo is the only archdiocese in Uruguay and, as its Ordinary, the archbishop is also Primate of the Catholic Church in Uruguay. The archdiocese's mother church and thus seat of its archbishop is Catedral de la Inmaculada Concepción y San Felipe y Santiago. Church and state are officially separated since 1916 in Uruguay. As of 2010, the Archbishop of Montevideo is Daniel Fernando Sturla Berhouet, SDB, since his appointment on 11 February 2014.

Other religious faiths in Montevideo are Protestantism, Umbanda, Judaism, and there are many people who define themselves as Atheists and Agnostics, while others profess "believing in God but without religion".

==== Montevideo Metropolitan Cathedral ====
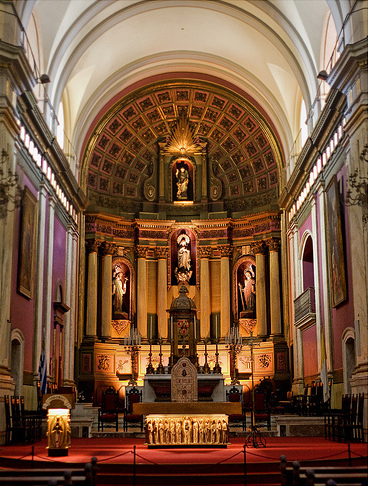
Cathedral Interior

The Montevideo Metropolitan Cathedral is the main Roman Catholic church of Montevideo. It is located in Ciudad Vieja, immediately across Constitution Square from the Cabildo. In 1740 a brick church was built on the site. In 1790, the foundation was laid for the current neoclassical structure. The church was consecrated in 1804. Bicentennial celebrations were held in 2004.

In 1897, Pope Leo XIII elevated the church to Metropolitan Cathedral status. Important ceremonies are conducted under the direction of the Archbishop of Montevideo. Weddings and choral concerts are held here and the parish priest conducts the routine functions of the cathedral. In the 19th century, its precincts were also used as a burial place of famous people who died in the city. For decades, the prison and the nearby Punta Carretas parish church were the only major buildings in the neighborhood.

==== Nuestra Señora del Sagrado Corazón ====
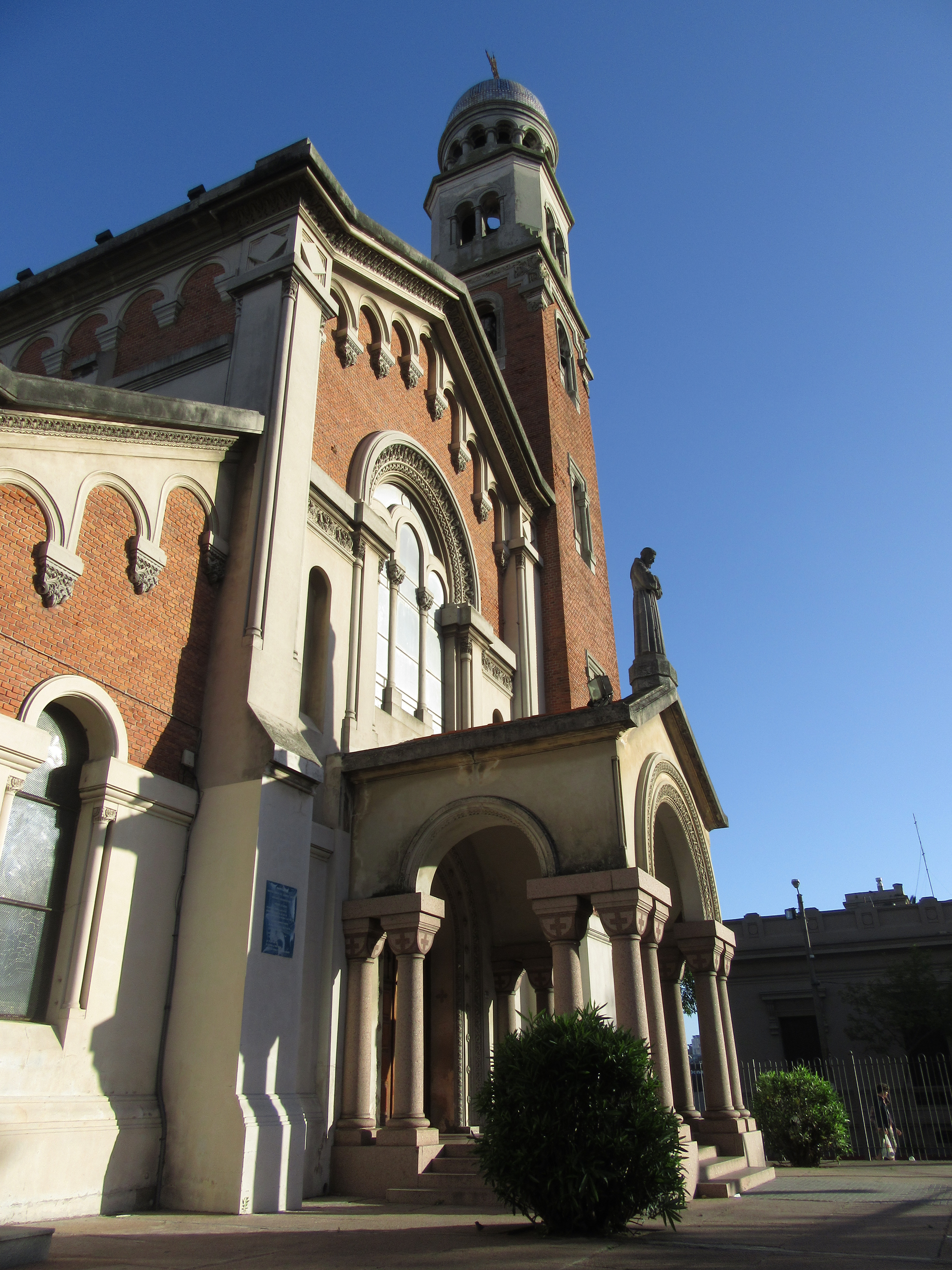
Punta Carretas Church

Nuestra Señora del Sagrado Corazón ("Our Lady of the Sacred Heart"), also known as Iglesia Punta Carretas ("Punta Carretas Church"), was built between 1917 and 1927 in the Romanesque Revival style. The church was originally part of the Order of Friars Minor Capuchin, but is presently in the parish of the Ecclesiastic Curia. Its location is at the corner of Solano García and José Ellauri. It has a nave and aisles. The roof has many vaults. During the construction of the Punta Carretas Shopping complex, major cracks developed in the structure of the church as a result of differential foundation settlement.

== Economy ==
As the capital of Uruguay, Montevideo is the economic and political center of the country. Most of the largest and wealthiest businesses in Uruguay have their headquarters in the city. Since the 1990s the city has undergone rapid economic development and modernization, including two of Uruguay's most important buildings—the World Trade Center Montevideo (1998), and Telecommunications Tower (2000), the headquarters of Uruguay's government-owned telecommunications company ANTEL, increasing the city's integration into the global marketplace.

The Port of Montevideo, in the northern part of Ciudad Vieja, is one of the major ports of South America and plays a very important role in the city's economy. The port has been growing rapidly and consistently at an average annual rate of 14 percent due to an increase in foreign trade. The city has received a US$20 million loan from the Inter-American Development Bank to modernize the port, increase its size and efficiency, and enable lower maritime and river transportation costs.

The most important state-owned companies headquartered in Montevideo are: AFE (railways), ANCAP (Energy), Administracion Nacional de Puertos (Ports), ANTEL (telecommunications), BHU (savings and loan), BROU (bank), BSE (insurance), OSE (water & sewage), UTE (electricity). These companies operate under public law, using a legal entity defined in the Uruguayan Constitution called Ente Autonomo ("autonomous entity"). The government also owns part of other companies operating under private law, such as those owned wholly or partially by the CND (National Development Corporation).

Banking has traditionally been one of the strongest service export sectors in Uruguay: the country was once dubbed "the Switzerland of America", mainly for its banking sector and stability, although that stability has been threatened in the 21st century by the recent global economic climate. The largest bank in Uruguay is Banco Republica (BROU), based in Montevideo. 9 private banks, most of them branches of international banks, operate in the country (Banco Santander, BBVA, ABN AMRO, Citibank, among others). There are also a myriad of brokers and financial-services bureaus, among them Ficus Capital, Galfin Sociedad de Bolsa, Europa Sociedad de Bolsa, Darío Cukier, GBU, Hordeñana & Asociados Sociedad de Bolsa, etc.

=== Tourism ===
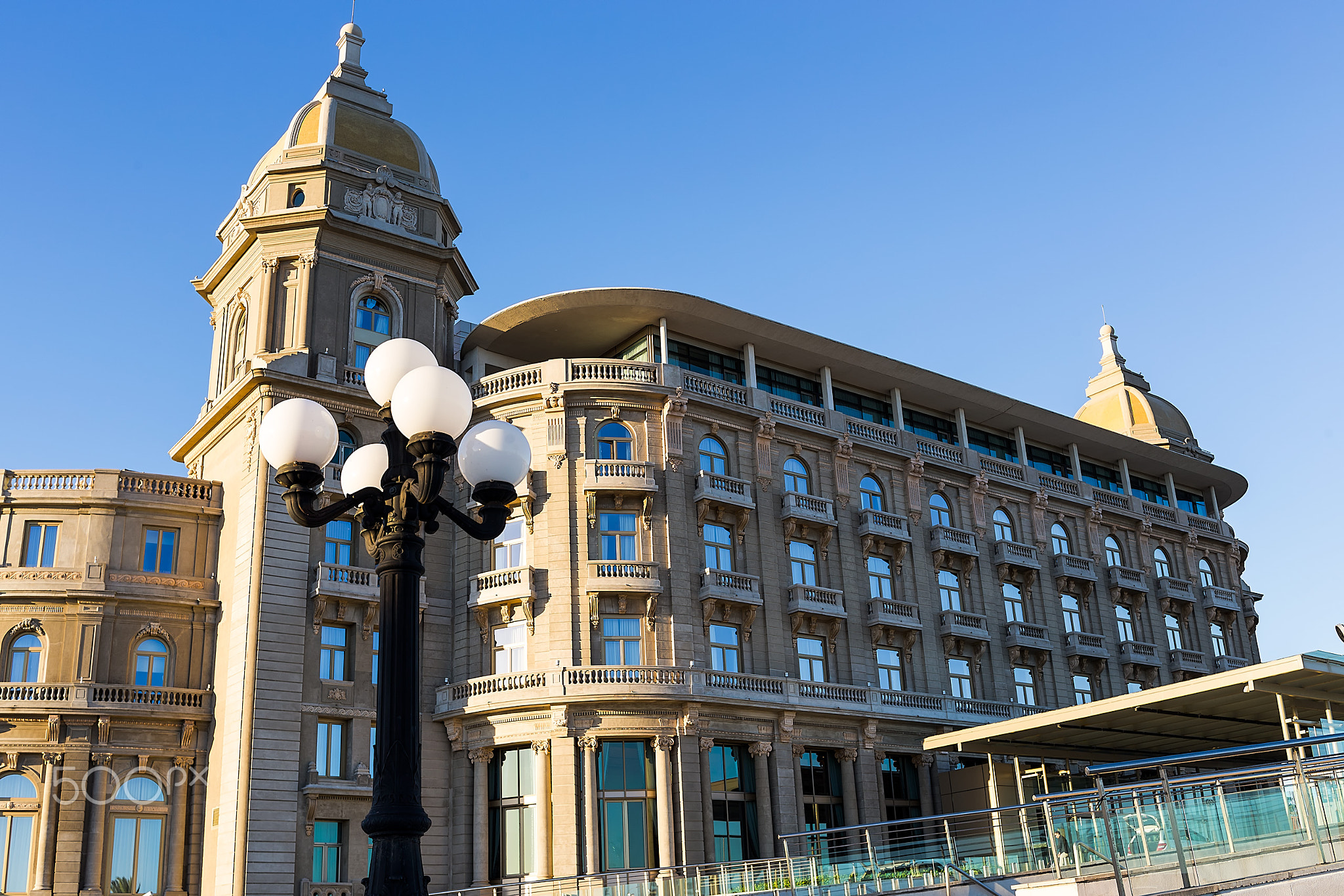
Hotel Casino Carrasco

Montevideo is Uruguay’s leading tourist destination, welcoming approximately 1 million visitors in 2024, which represents about 27% of all tourists visiting the country. The biggest share of international tourists come from Argentina, Brazil, Chile, Paraguay, and the United States. In 2025, Montevideo was designated as a smart destination and has been recognized as an LGBTQ-friendly city, reflecting Uruguay’s strong international standing in LGBTQ rights.

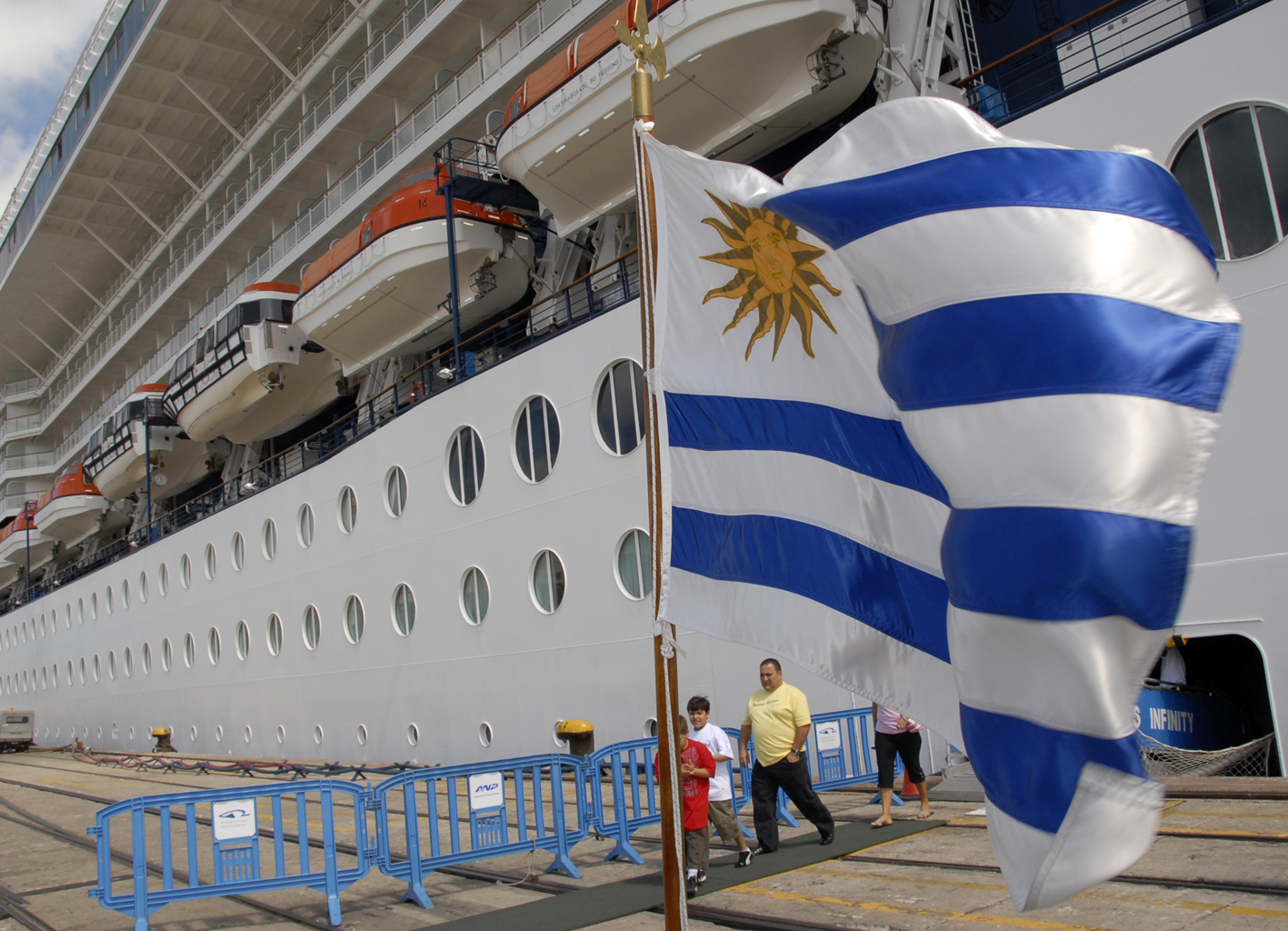
Cruise ship at the Port of Montevideo

Tourism in Montevideo is centered in the Ciudad Vieja area, which includes the city's oldest buildings, several museums, art galleries, and nightclubs, with Sarandí Street and the Mercado del Puerto being its most frequented venues. On the edge of Ciudad Vieja, Plaza Independencia is surrounded by many sights, including the Solís Theatre and the Palacio Salvo; the plaza also constitutes one end of 18 de Julio Avenue, the city's most important tourist destination outside of Ciudad Vieja. Apart from being a shopping street, the avenue is noted for its Art Deco buildings, three important public squares, the Gaucho Museum, the Palacio Municipal and many other sights. The avenue leads to the Obelisk of Montevideo; beyond that is Parque Batlle, which along with the Parque Prado is another important tourist destination. Along the coast, the Fortaleza del Cerro, the Rambla (the coastal avenue), 13 kilometers (8.1 mi) of sandy beaches, and Punta Gorda attract many tourists, as do the Barrio Sur and Palermo barrios.

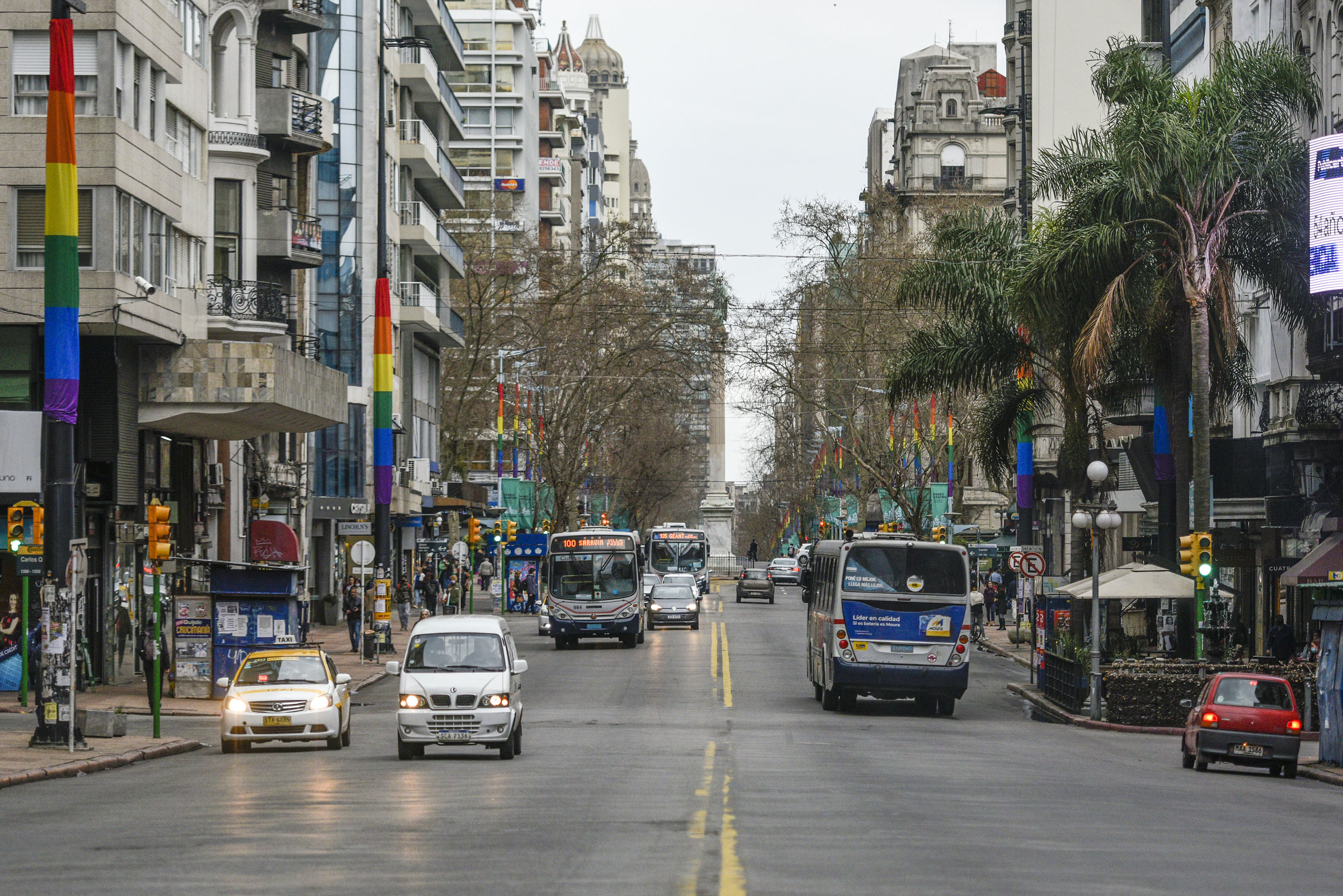
18 de Julio Avenue

The Ministry of Tourism offers a two-and-a-half-hour city tour and the Montevideo Tourist Guide Association offers guided tours in English, Italian, Portuguese and German. Apart from these, many private companies offer organized city tours.

Most tourists to the city come from Argentina, Brazil and Europe, with the number of visitors from elsewhere in Latin America and from the United States growing every year, thanks to an increasing number of international airline arrivals at Carrasco International Airport as well as cruises and ferries that arrive into the port of Montevideo.

=== Retail ===
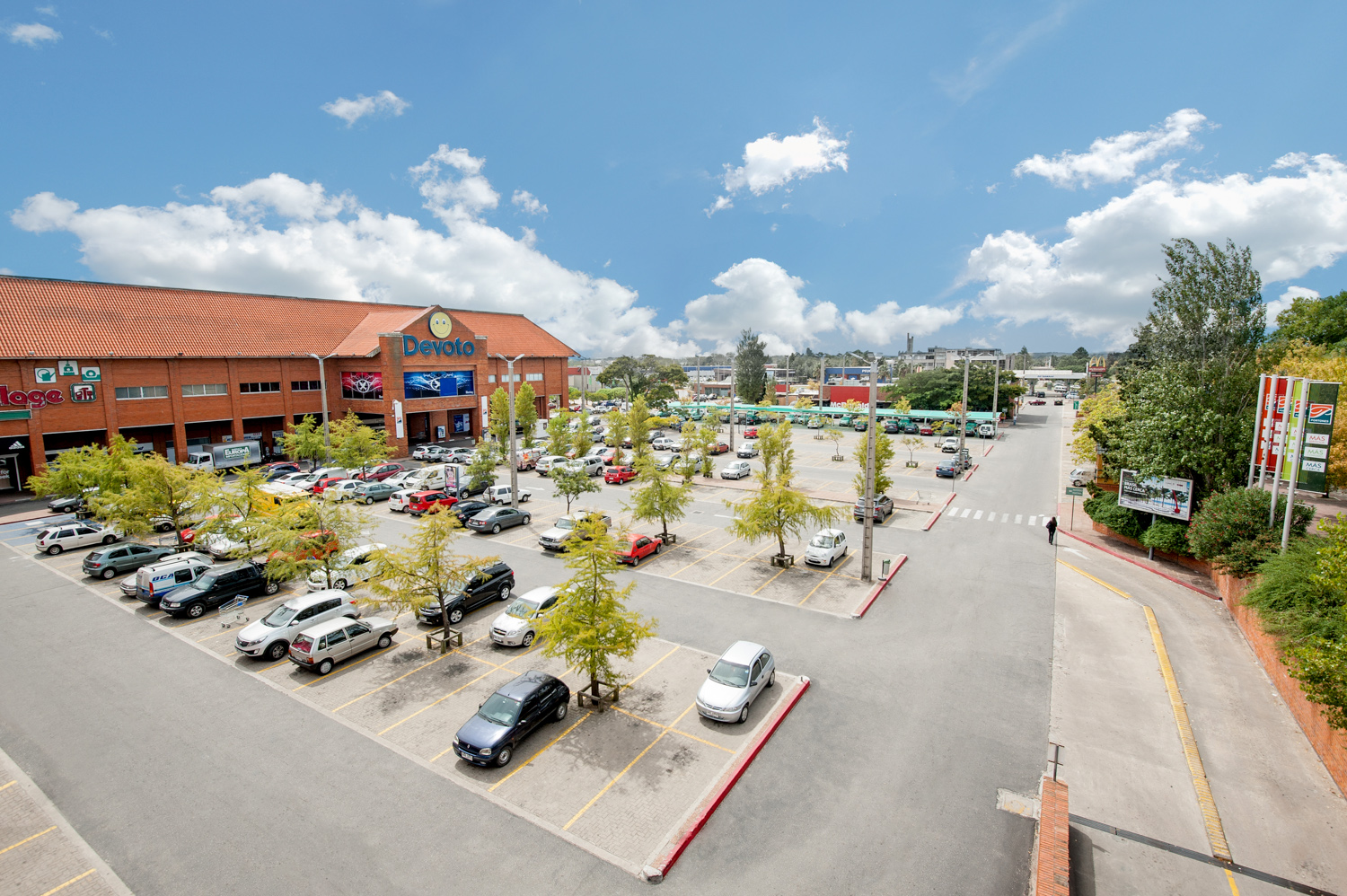
Portones Shopping

Montevideo is the heartland of retail, business, and real estate in Uruguay. Since the late 19th century, several department stores were established, turning the neighborhoods of Centro—particularly the 18 de Julio Avenue—and Ciudad Vieja into the city’s main commercial areas. However, beginning in the 1980s, shopping malls started to be built in different parts of the city, significantly altering its commercial landscape. In 1985, Montevideo Shopping became the first shopping mall in the Southern Cone.

In addition to the commercial areas located in the city center, other important retail zones include the neighborhoods of Unión, Belvedere and Paso del Molino, as well as Villa Muñoz—the city's historic Jewish quarter—noted for its concentration of low-cost retail establishments.

=== Media ===
Out of the 100 radio stations found in Uruguay, 40 of them are in Montevideo. The city has a vibrant artistic and literary community. The press enjoyed full freedom until the advent of the Civic-military dictatorship (1973–1985); this freedom returned on 1 March 1985, as part of the restoration of democracy.

Some of the important newspapers published in the city are: Brecha, La República, El Observador, El País, Gaceta Comercial and la Diaria. El Día was the most prestigious paper in Uruguay, founded in 1886 by José Batlle, who would later go on to become President of Uruguay. The paper ceased production in the early 1990s. All television stations have their headquarters in Montevideo, for example: Saeta Channel 10, Teledoce, Channel 4 and National Television (Channel 5)

== Transport ==
=== Public transport ===
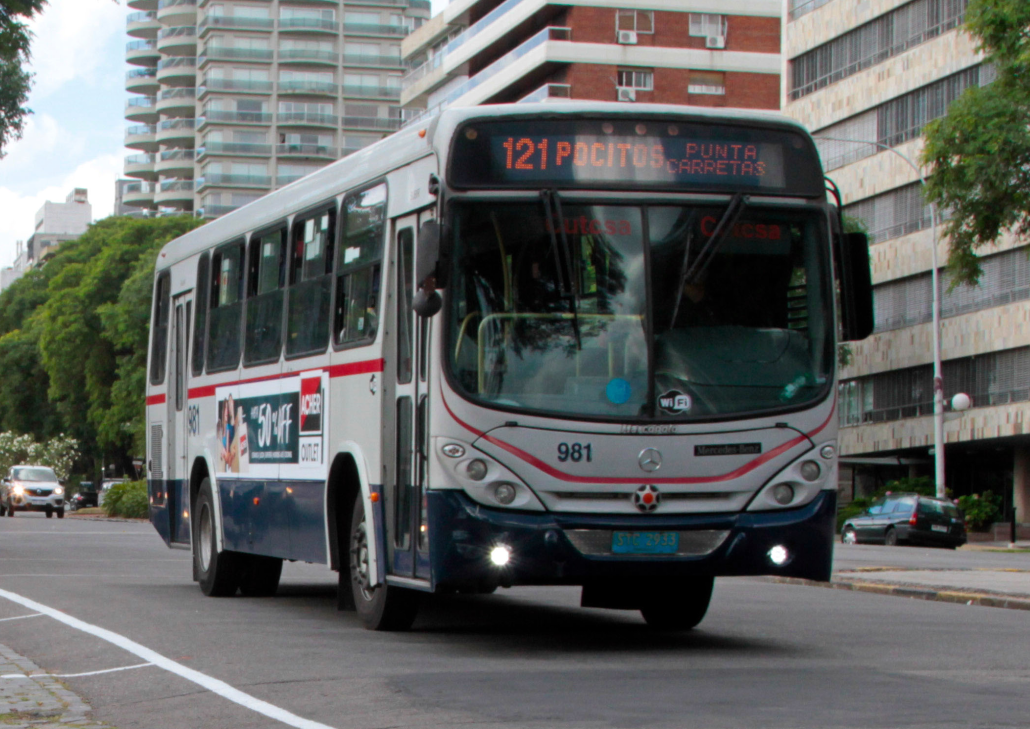
Bus of CUTCSA, the largest bus company in Montevideo.

The city and its metropolitan area have a bus transportation network, the Sistema Mets acronym. It covers urban and interurban services within the Metropolitan Area and is administered by the municipal government together with the Ministry of Transport and Public Works. The Baltasar Brum Terminal located in Ciudad Vieja, is the main urban bus station. However, there are numerous interchanges and terminals distributed in both the city and the metropolitan area.

=== Taxis ===
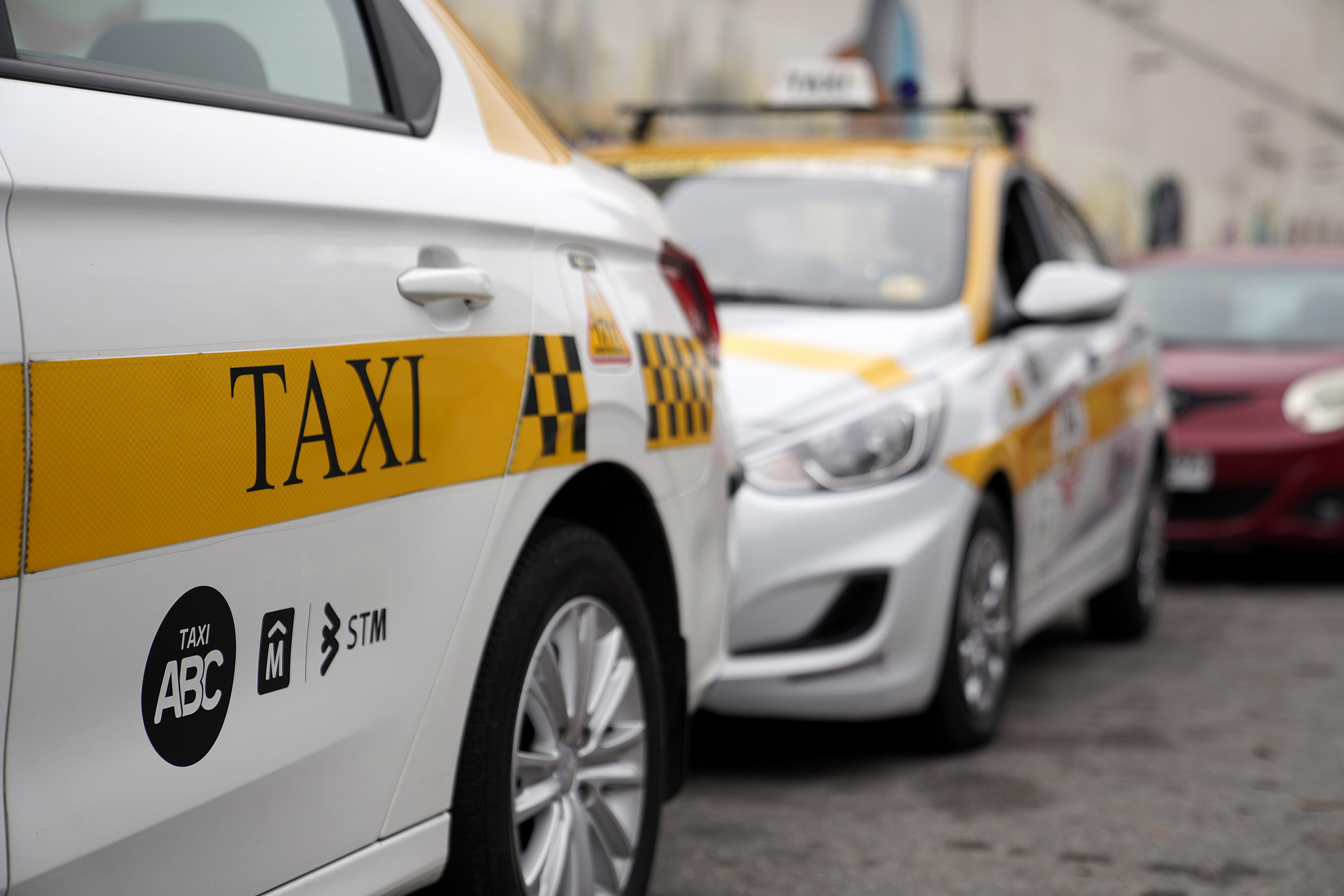
Taxis of Montevideo.

The livery of most Montevideo taxis features white on the sides, along with a yellow band, as well as yellow on the top of the car. To determine the rate they use a taximeter, which will determine the price depending on the distance traveled. All taxis accept cash, although it is also common that a passenger can pay with a credit card.

=== Rail ===
The State Railways Administration of Uruguay (AFE) operates three commuter rail lines, namely the Empalme Olmos, San Jose and Florida. These lines operate to major suburban areas of Canelones, San José and Florida. Within the Montevideo city limits, local trains stop at Lorenzo Carnelli, Yatai (Step Mill), Sayago, Colón (line to San Jose and Florida), Peñarol and Manga (line Empalme Olmos) stations. The historic 19th century General Artigas Central Station located in the barrio Aguada, six blocks from the central business district, was abandoned 1 March 2003 and remains closed. A new station, 500 meters (1,600 ft) north of the old one and part of the Telecommunications Tower modern complex, has taken over the rail traffic.

The train service is currently suspended for works related to the modernization of the railway system until mid-2023 when the work will end.

=== Intercity buses ===
The Tres Cruces bus station is the main bus terminal in Uruguay, serving long-distance buses that travel into Montevideo, from other parts of the country and abroad. Inaugurated in 1994, it serves more than 12 million passengers per year.

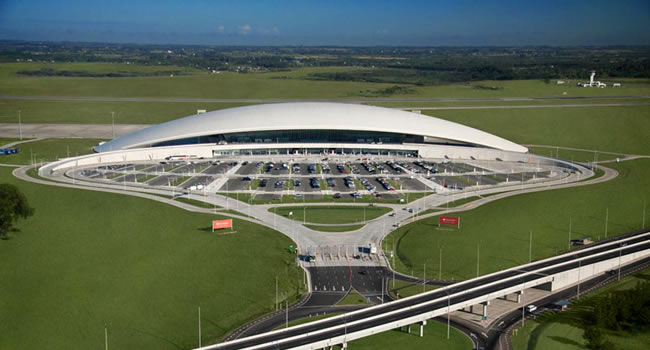
Carrasco International Airport

Companies operating at Tres Cruces bus station: Agencia central, Bruno, Copsa, Cromin, Cynsa, Copay, Cot, Cut, Corporacion, Cita, Cauvi, Colonia Express, El Condor, El Norteño, Ega, Expreso Chago, Expreso Minuano, Intertur, Nossar, Nuñez, Rutas del sol, TTL, Turil, Turismar, etc.

=== Aviation ===
Montevideo is served by the Carrasco International Airport (IATA: MVD, ICAO: SUMU), which is located in the north of Ciudad de la Costa, in Canelones Department, 19 km (12 mi) from the city center. It handles over 1,5 million passengers per year, and has been cited as one of the most efficient and traveler-friendly airports in Latin America.

Ángel S. Adami Airport is a private airport operated by minor charter companies and in which there is also a flight school.

=== Port ===
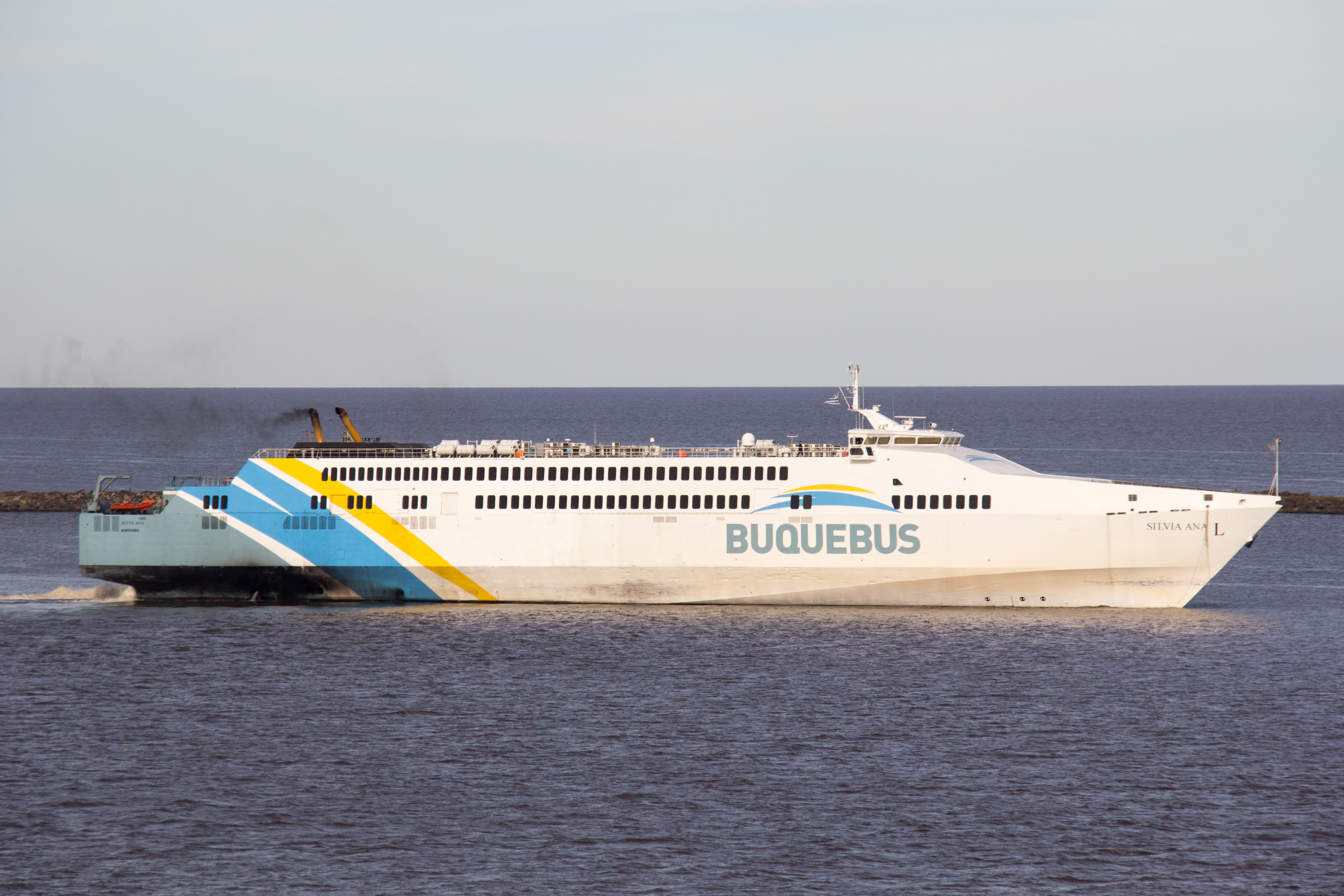
Buquebus high-speed ferries connect Montevideo to Argentina

Montevideo is also served by a ferry system operated by the company Buquebus that connects the port with Buenos Aires. More than 2.2 million people per year travel between Argentina and Uruguay with Buquebus. One of these ships is a catamaran, which can reach a top speed of about 80 km/h (50 mph).

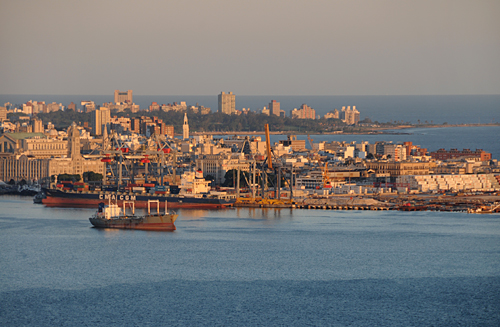
Port of Montevideo

The port on Montevideo Bay is one of the reasons the city was founded. It gives natural protection to ships, although two jetties now further protect the harbor entrance from waves. This natural port is competitive with the other great port of Río de la Plata, Buenos Aires.

The main engineering work on the port occurred between the years 1870 and 1930. These six decades saw the construction of the port's first wooden pier, several warehouses in La Aguada, the north and south Rambla, a river port, a new pier, the dredged river basin and the La Teja Refinery. A major storm in 1923 necessitated repairs to many of the city's engineering works. Since the second half of the 20th century, until the 21st century, physical changes had ceased, and since that time the area had degraded due to national economic stagnation.

The port's proximity has contributed to the installation of various industries in the area surrounding the bay, particularly import/export businesses and other business related to port and naval activity. The density of industrial development in the area surrounding the port has kept its popularity as a residential area relatively low despite its centrality. The main environmental problems are subaquatic sedimentation and air and water contamination.

Every year more than one hundred cruises arrive, bringing tourists to Montevideo by public or private tours.

=== Cycling ===
The city has bicycle circuits in Ciudad Vieja, Artigas Boulevard and Centro as well as with good facilities for cyclists such as bike paths and bike racks throughout the city. In 2013 the "South Bicicircuito" was also inaugurated, which connects several of the dependent faculties of the University of the Republic. There are more than 100 bike stations in the city. In 2014, a bicycle sharing system called Movete was launched.

== Education ==
=== Public education ===
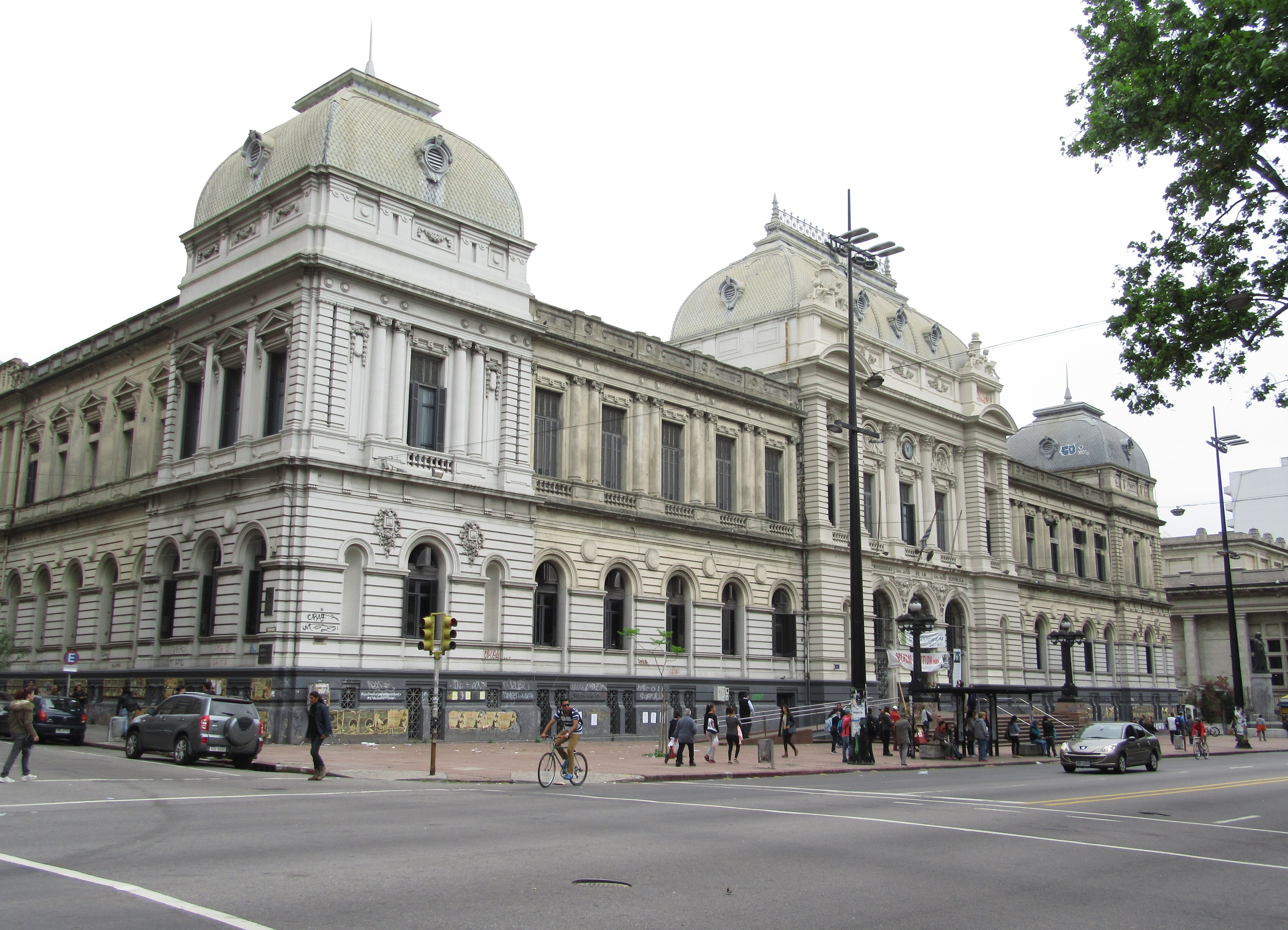
University of the Republic law school.

The University of the Republic is the country's largest and most important university, with a student body of 81,774, according to the census of 2007. It was founded on 18 July 1849 in Montevideo, where most of its buildings and facilities are still located. The university houses 14 faculties (departments) and various institutes and schools. Many eminent Uruguayans have graduated from this university, including Carlos Vaz Ferreira, José Luis Massera, Gabriel Paternain, Mario Wschebor, Roman Fresnedo Siri, Carlos Ott and Eladio Dieste.

The process of founding the country's public university began on 11 June 1833 with the passage of a law proposed by Senator Dámaso Antonio Larrañaga. It called for the creation of nine academic departments; the President of the Republic would pass a decree formally creating the departments once the majority of them were in operation. In 1836, the House of General Studies was formed, housing the departments of Latin, philosophy, mathematics, theology and jurisprudence. On 27 May 1838, Manuel Oribe passed a decree establishing the Greater University of the Republic. That decree had few practical effects, given the institutional instability of the Oriental Republic of Uruguay at that time.

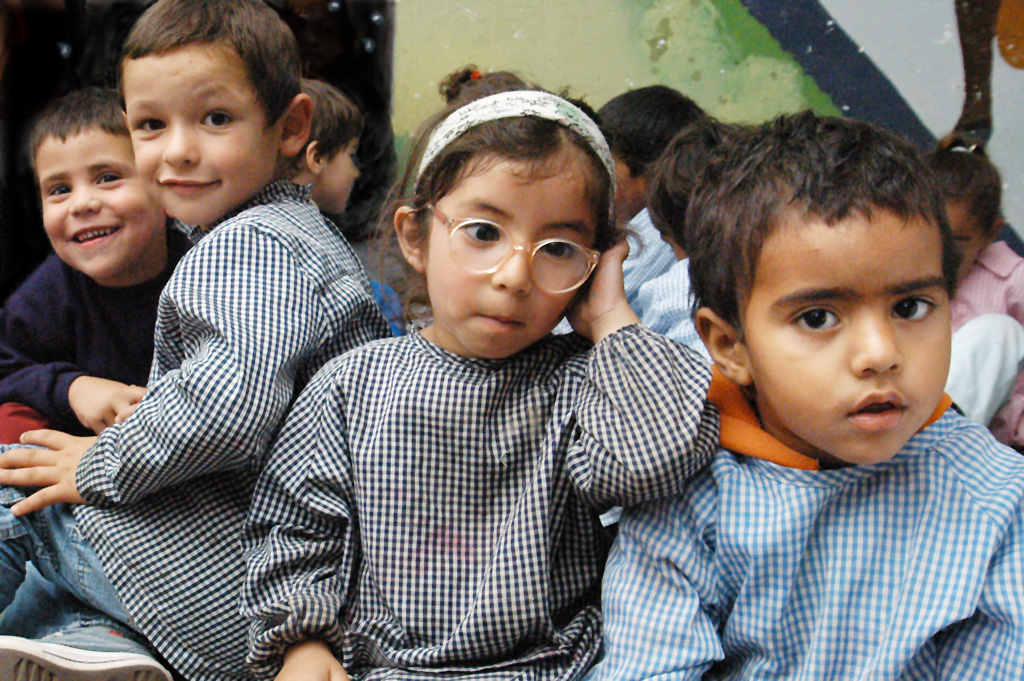
Kindergarten kids at a public school in Montevideo

=== Private education ===
The largest private university in Uruguay, is also located in Montevideo. ORT Uruguay was first established as a non-profit organization in 1942, and was officially certified as a private university in September 1996, becoming the first private educational institution in the country to achieve that status. It is a member of World ORT, an international educational network founded in 1880 by the Jewish community in Saint Petersburg, Russia. The university has about 8,000 students, distributed among 5 faculties and institutes, mainly geared towards the sciences and technology/engineering.

Another private university in Uruguay is the University of Montevideo. It opened in 1986 and obtained the right to be legally named a university in 1997. With its seven schools the UM has facilities all over Montevideo. Since 2019 the university is ranked in the Top 500 in the world by the QS World University Rankings (QSWUR).

The Montevideo Crandon Institute is an American School of missionary origin and the main Methodist educational institution in Uruguay.

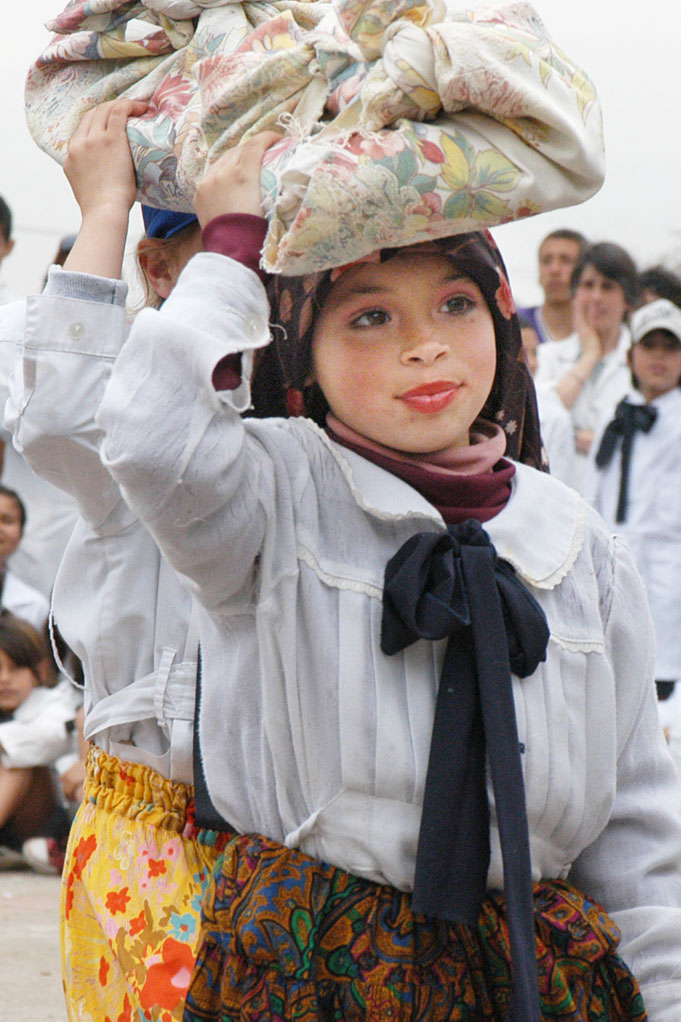
A laundress girl in a school play in Montevideo

The Christian Brothers of Ireland Stella Maris College is a private, co-educational, not-for-profit Catholic school located in the wealthy residential southeastern neighborhood of Carrasco.

Also in Carrasco is The British Schools of Montevideo, one of the oldest educational institutions in the country, founded in 1908.

Other educational institutions of note include Colegio Ingles, John XXIII Institute, Lycée Français de Montevideo, Ivy Thomas, German School of Montevideo and Colegio Preuniversitario Ciudad de San Felipe.

== Healthcare ==
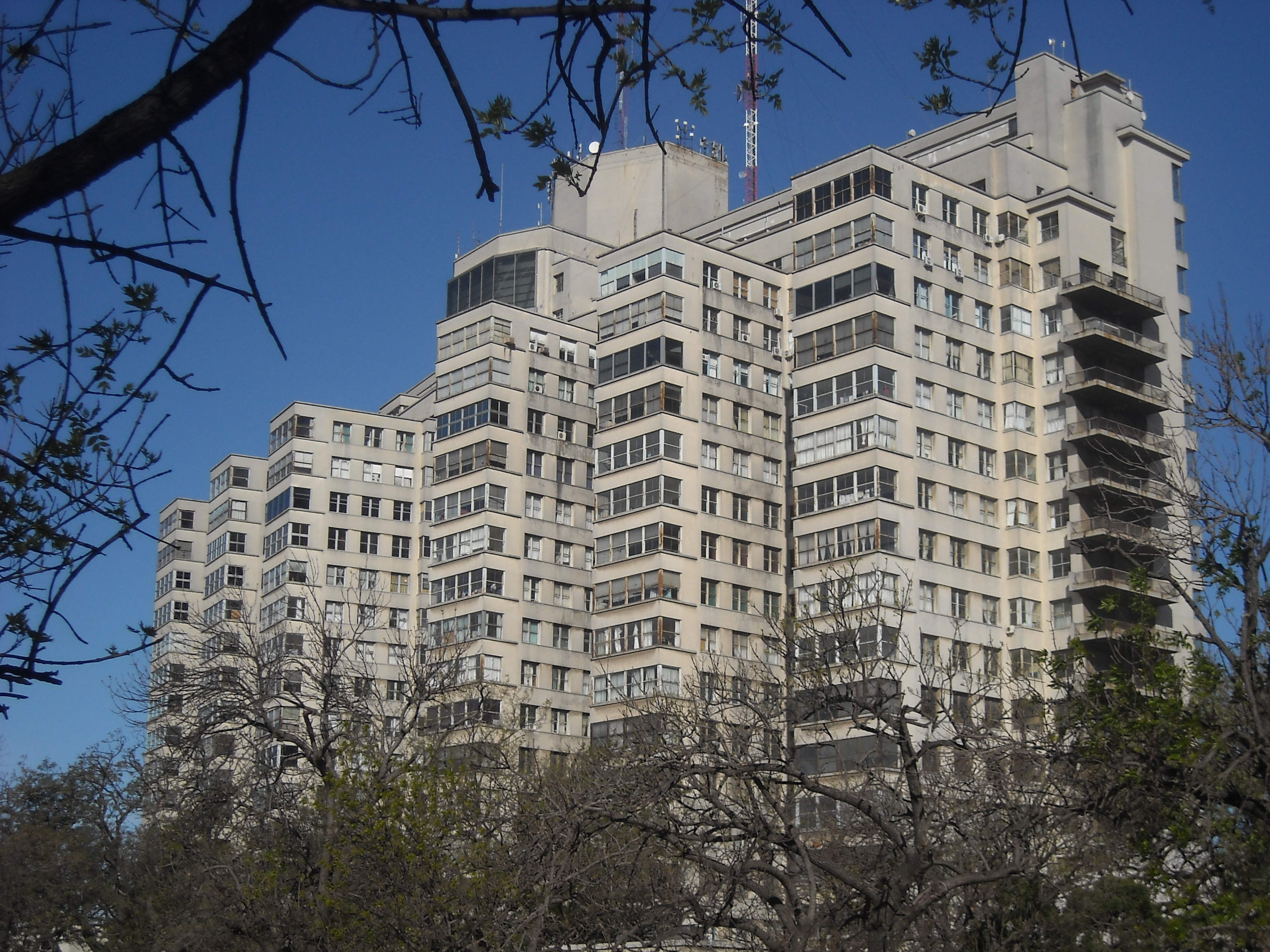
Hospital de Clínicas, teaching hospital of the University of the Republic.

Montevideo is a major centre for healthcare and medical training in Uruguay. The city’s healthcare system operates within the framework of the National Integrated Health System, which comprises both public and private providers. Healthcare services are delivered primarily by the Instituciones de Asistencia Médica Colectiva (IAMC), private non-profit organisations that provide comprehensive care to beneficiaries of the social security system. These institutions are commonly referred to as mutualistas and typically operate facilities known as sanatorios.

The system is financed through the National Health Insurance, a contributory and solidarity-based scheme. The National Health Fund, administered by the Banco de Previsión Social, functions as both a revenue-collecting and resource-distributing body, receiving contributions from employees, employers, and the state through general taxation. Major IAMC providers in Montevideo include Médica Uruguaya, Asociación Española, Círculo Católico, CASMU, and Hospital Evangélico.

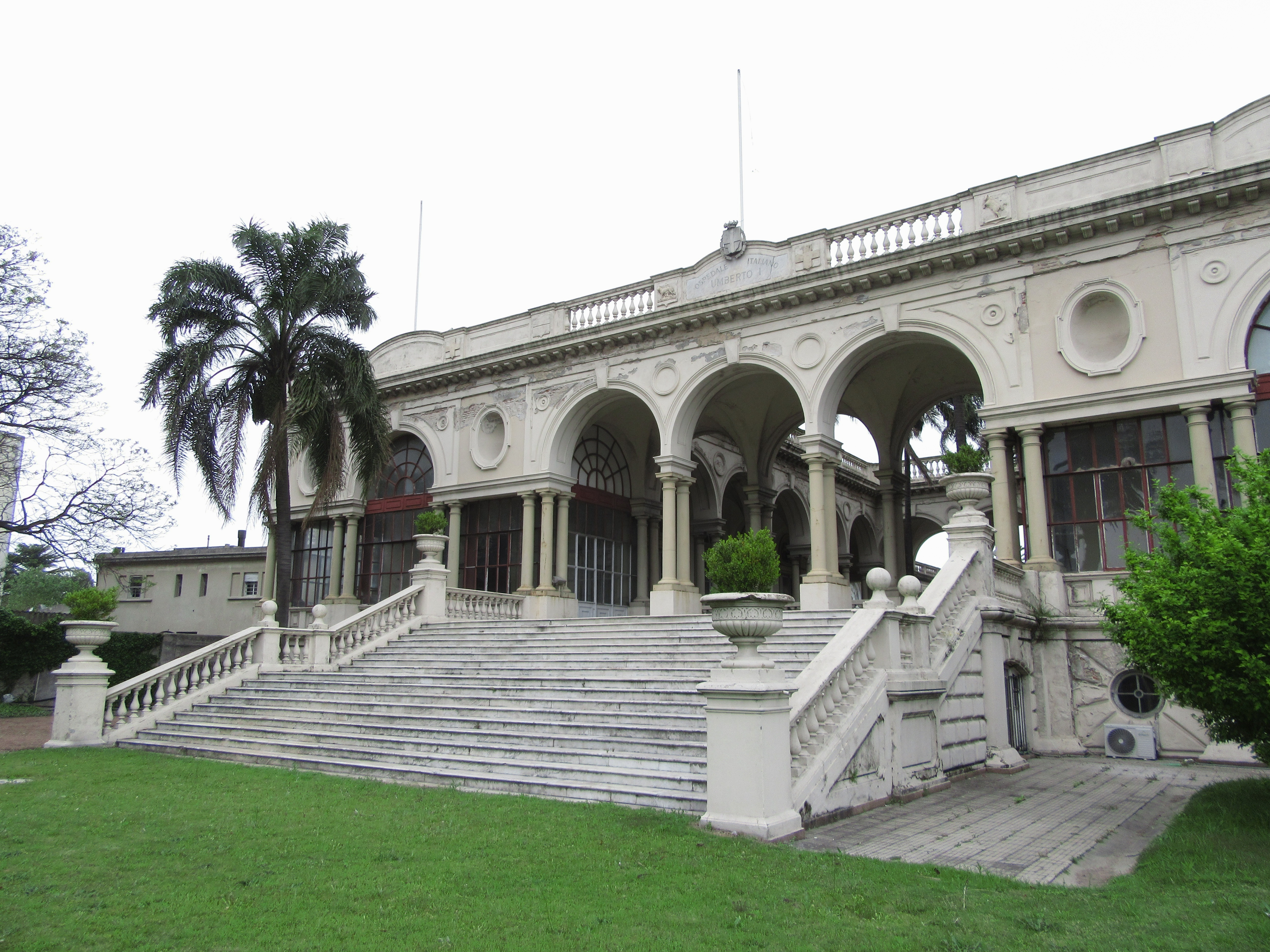
Italian Hospital of Montevideo

Public healthcare is administered by the State Health Services Administration (ASSE). Public hospitals in Montevideo include the Hospital Clinic Manuel Quintela, which serves as the teaching hospital of the University of the Republic; Hospital Maciel; Hospital Pereira Rossell, a major paediatric and maternal care centre; the psychiatric Hospital Vilardebó; Hospital Saint Bois; Hospital Pasteur; and the Spanish Hospital, as well as other specialised facilities.

The Intendancy of Montevideo and ASSE also operates a network of community polyclinics across different neighbourhoods, providing primary care services including general medicine, paediatrics, gynaecology and dentistry to users of the public health system.

== International relations ==
=== Twin towns and sister relations ===
Montevideo is twinned with:

- Arica, Chile
- Asunción, Paraguay
- Barcelona, Spain
- Berisso, Argentina
- Bluefields, Nicaragua
- Brasília, Brazil
- Cádiz, Spain
- Cali, Colombia
- Ceuta, Spain
- Cochabamba, Bolivia
- Córdoba, Argentina
- Coroico, Bolivia
- Cumaná, Venezuela
- Curitiba, Brazil
- El Aaiun, Western Sahara
- Esmeraldas, Ecuador
- Hurlingham, Argentina
- La Plata, Argentina
- Libertador, Venezuela
- Lisbon, Portugal
- Mar del Plata, Argentina
- Marsico Nuovo, Basilicata, Italy
- Melilla, Spain
- Mississauga, Ontario, Canada (1998; no longer active)
- Montevideo, Minnesota, United States< (relationship began in 1905)
- Paris, France
- Port-au-Prince, Haiti
- Qingdao, Shandong, China
- Quebec City, Canada
- Rosario, Argentina
- Saint Petersburg, Russia
- Santa Cruz, Bolivia
- São Paulo, Brazil
- Satriano di Lucania, Basilicata, Italy
- Shenzhen, Guangdong, China
- Talamanca, Costa Rica
- Tambo de Mora, Peru
- Tianjin, China
- Tito, Basilicata, Italy
- Tumaco, Colombia
- Ulsan, South Korea
- Wrocław, Poland
- Wuhu, Anhui, China

Montevideo is part of the Union of Ibero-American Capital Cities since 12 October 1982.

== Bibliography ==
- Albes, Edward. Montevideo, the city of roses (US Government Printing Office, 1922).
- Finzer, R David. The Southron's Guide to Living in Uruguay. The Southron. ISBN 982-9801-31-4.
