= Parque Batlle =

Parque Batlle–Villa Dolores
- Barrio and park
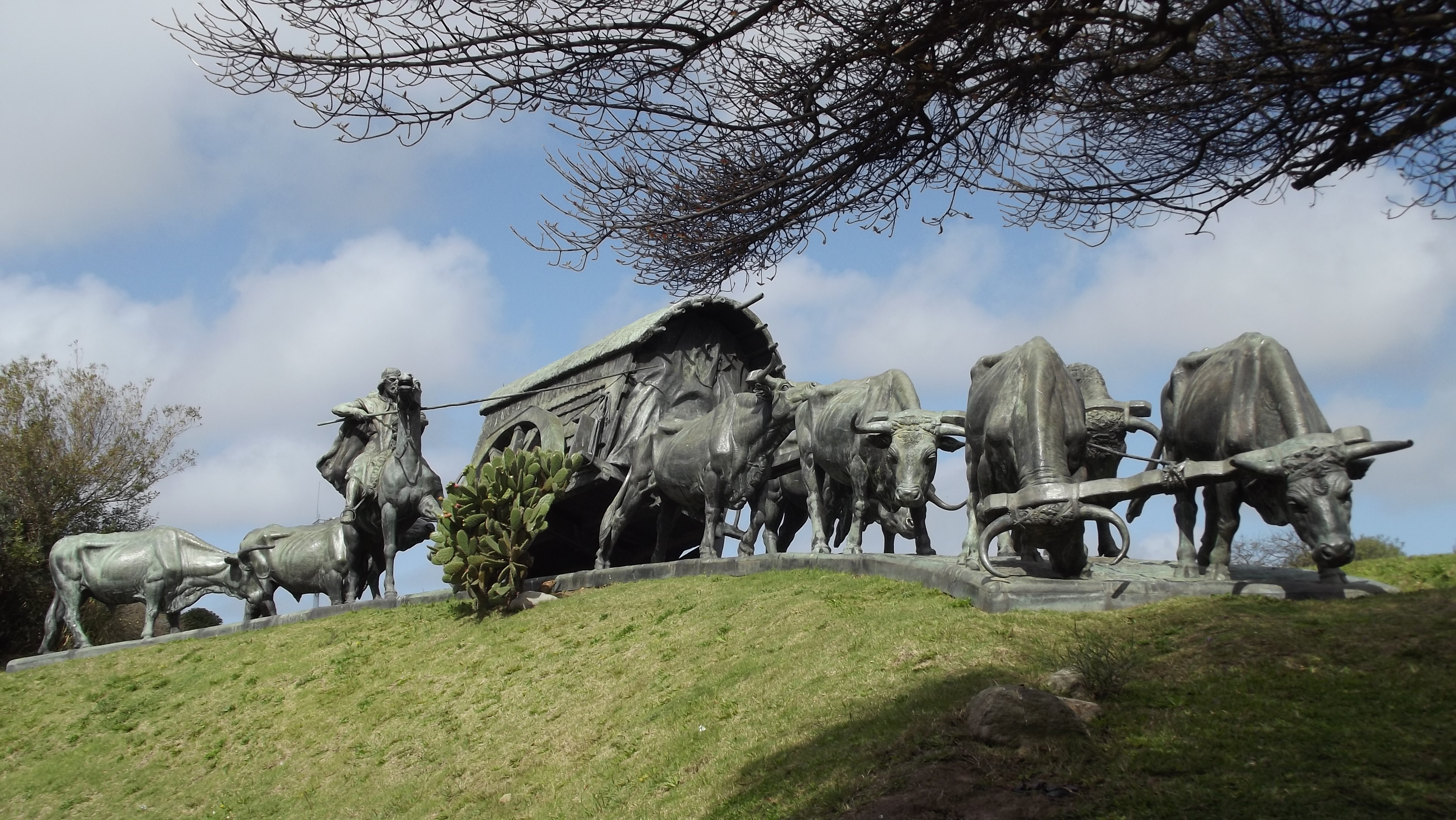
- Monumento La Carreta

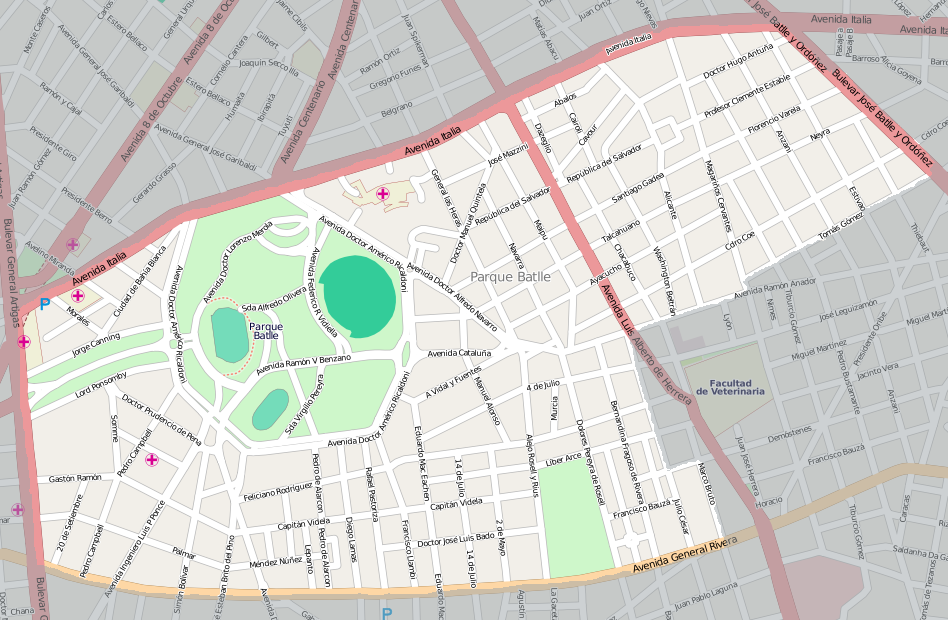
- Street map of Parque Batlle–Villa Dolores

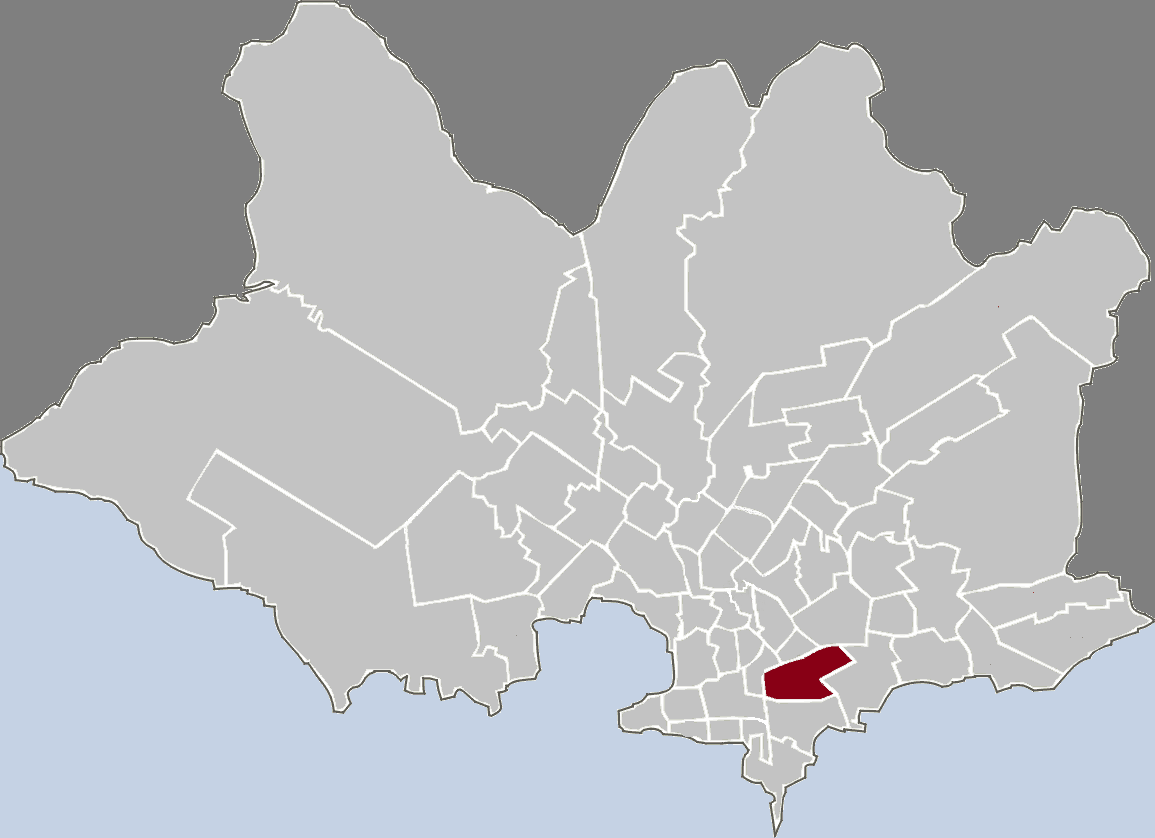
- Map of Montevideo highlighting the barrio
- Coordinates: 34°53′42″S 56°9′16″W
- Country: Uruguay
- Department: Montevideo Department
- City: Montevideo
- Website: www.parquebatlle.tk

Parque Batlle (Spanish pronunciation: [ˈpaɾke ˈβaʝe], locally [ˈpaɾke ˈβaʒe, - ˈβaʃe]), formerly Parque de los Aliados (Allied Park), is a barrio (neighbourhood or district) and a major public central park in Uruguay's capital city of Montevideo. It is named in honour of José Batlle y Ordóñez, President of Uruguay from 1903-1907 and 1911–1915.

== Location ==
The barrio is located south of Avenida Italia and north of Rivera Avenue and includes the districts Belgrano, Italiano, Villa Dolores and the park area. It borders the barrios Tres Cruces to the west and north, La Blanqueada and Unión to the north, Buceo to the east and Pocitos to the south.

The park covers an area of 60 hectares (150 acres) and is considered the "lung" of Montevideo owing to the large variety of trees planted here. It is home to the Estadio Centenario national football stadium, as well as the national monument "La Carreta".

== History ==
In 1907, Pablo Nereo Gabriel Antonio Pereira (1838–1906) donated eleven acres of his land, which was then named after him as "Campo Pereira," for a building a park, to the Economic Management Board, and the idea of a park was created by an Act of March 1907 which also projected wide boulevards and avenues. The project's landscape French architect, Carlos Thays, began the plantings in 1911 and completed it with all the attendant embellishments required for a park. In 1918, the park was named "Allied Park," following the allied Army winning the World War I thus honouring the heroes of the Allied Forces. The park was further expanded to the present status, which covers an area of 60 hectares (150 acres). This extension was made possible owing to an estate that Antonio Pereira in his "Will" had bequeathed partly to the municipality in May 1930. The Board then further acquired more land and created the Great Park Pereira seen in its present status. On 5 May 1930, it was again renamed as Parque Batlle y Ordóñez, in memory of the President of Uruguay, who had died in 1929. In the same year, the Estadio Centenario was opened. Between 1935 and 1938, the athletics track and the municipal velodrome were completed. It was designated a National Historic Monument Park in 1975.

== The barrio ==
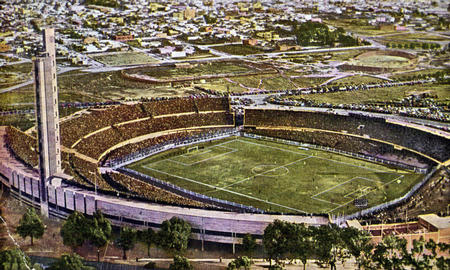
Estadio Centenario

Parque Batlle is counted as one of the seven coastal barrios, along with Punta Carretas, Pocitos, Buceo, Malvín, Punta Gorda and Carrasco. It is characterized as being of high population density and most of the households are of medium-high- or high-income. According to Administración Nacional de Educación Pública (ANEP) of Uruguay, the Parque Batlle school district, Villa Dolores, was ranked 55 of 60 for the period of 1990–1999.

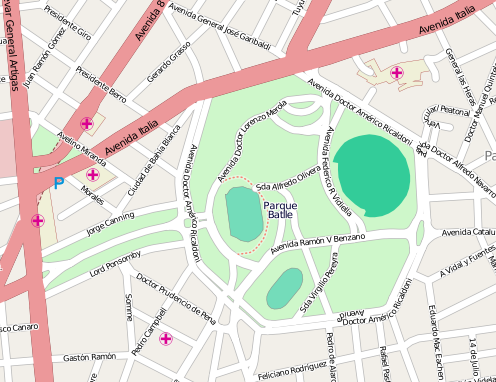
The park area

== The park ==
Along with Parque Prado and Parque Rodó, Batlle is one of three large parks that dominate Montevideo. The park contains the 70,000 seat Estadio Centenario, built for the first soccer world cup in 1930, which is both the national football stadium and it contains a football museum. There is also the Tabaré Athletic Club which is occasionally made over as a carnival theatre using impermanent materials. The Municipal Velodrome, two smaller stadiums (the Parque Palermo and the Parque Luis Méndez Piana), and a target shooting facility are additional attractions. It is an ideal place for walking, hiking or exercise and enjoy the fresh air provided by the wooded area.

== Villa Dolores and the Zoo of Montevideo ==
Villa Dolores is a district of Parque Batlle. It took its name from the original Villa of Don Alejo Rossell y Rius and of Doña Dolores Pereira de Rossel who started there a private collection of animals which became a zoological garden. It was passed to the city in 1919, and in 1955 the Planetarium of Montevideo was built within its premises.

== Monuments ==
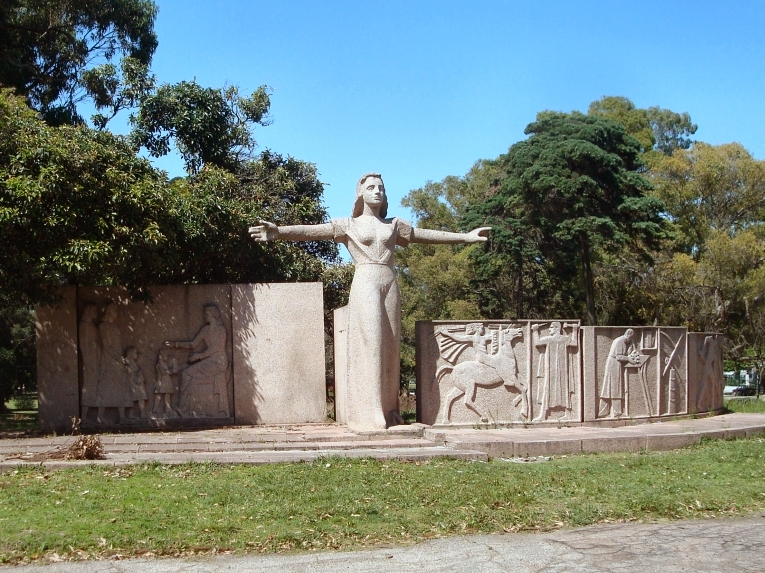
Monument to the Teacher, by Bernabé Michelena.

In 1934, "La Carreta", a bronze monument on granite base by José Belloni was introduced. The monument, one of several statues in the park, is located on Avenida Lorenzo Merola near Estadio Centenario and depicts yoked oxen pulling a loaded wagon. It was designated a national monument in 1976. Another statue in the same side of the park is a bronze copy of the Discobolus of Myron.

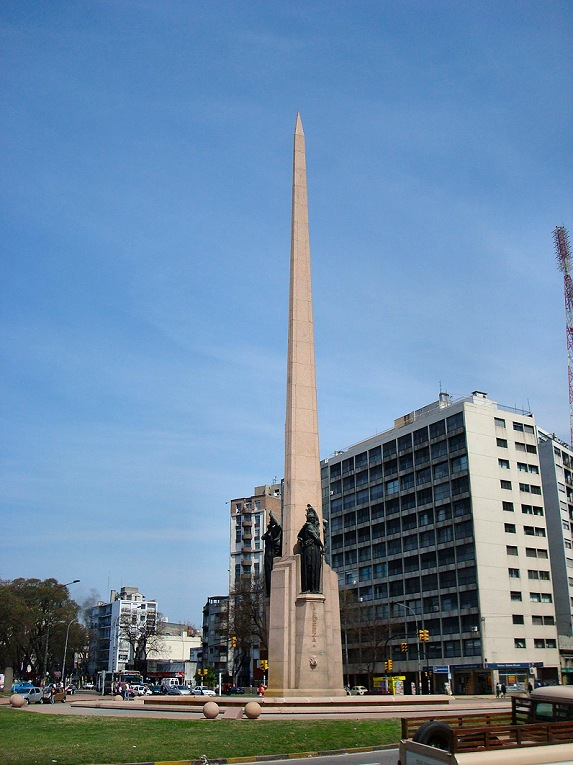
The Obelisk of Montevideo marks the west end of the park area.

On the West side of Parque Batlle, on Artigas Boulevard, there is the Obelisk of Montevideo, a monument dedicated to those who created the first Constitution and inaugurated in 1938. It is a monumental work of the sculptor José Luis Zorrilla de San Martín (1891–1975). It is a three-sided obelisk made of granite, 40 metres (130 ft) tall with 3 bronze statues on its sides, representing "Law", "Liberty" and "Force." It has a hexagonal water fountain around it with six spheres on its outer circumference. It is located at the intersection of 18 de Julio and Artigas Boulevard avenues, in Montevideo, at the entrance of the Parque Batlle area. It is a National Heritage Site since 1976.

== Notable buildings ==
Video of the park and barrio Parque Batlle

Apart from the stadium, the area around the park has many buildings notable for their architecture and style. Among them are several hospitals, the biggest of which is the Hospital de Clínicas of the Faculty of Medicine of the University of the Republic and a Site of Municipal Interest since 1995, the Italian Hospital and Pereira Rossell Hospital (next to the obelisk), the Hospital Británico, a National Heritage Site since 1975, the Sanatorio Americano, Médica Uruguaya to the west of the northwest point of the park and others. Two other National Heritage Sites, both opposite the Estadio Centenario, are Conedor Universitario No. 2 (the Canteen of the University) and the Instituto de Higiene.

== Places of worship ==
- Parish Church of St Ignatius of Loyola, Alejo Rossell y Rius 1613 (Roman Catholic, Jesuites)
