= Rambla of Montevideo =

Street in Montevideo, Uruguay

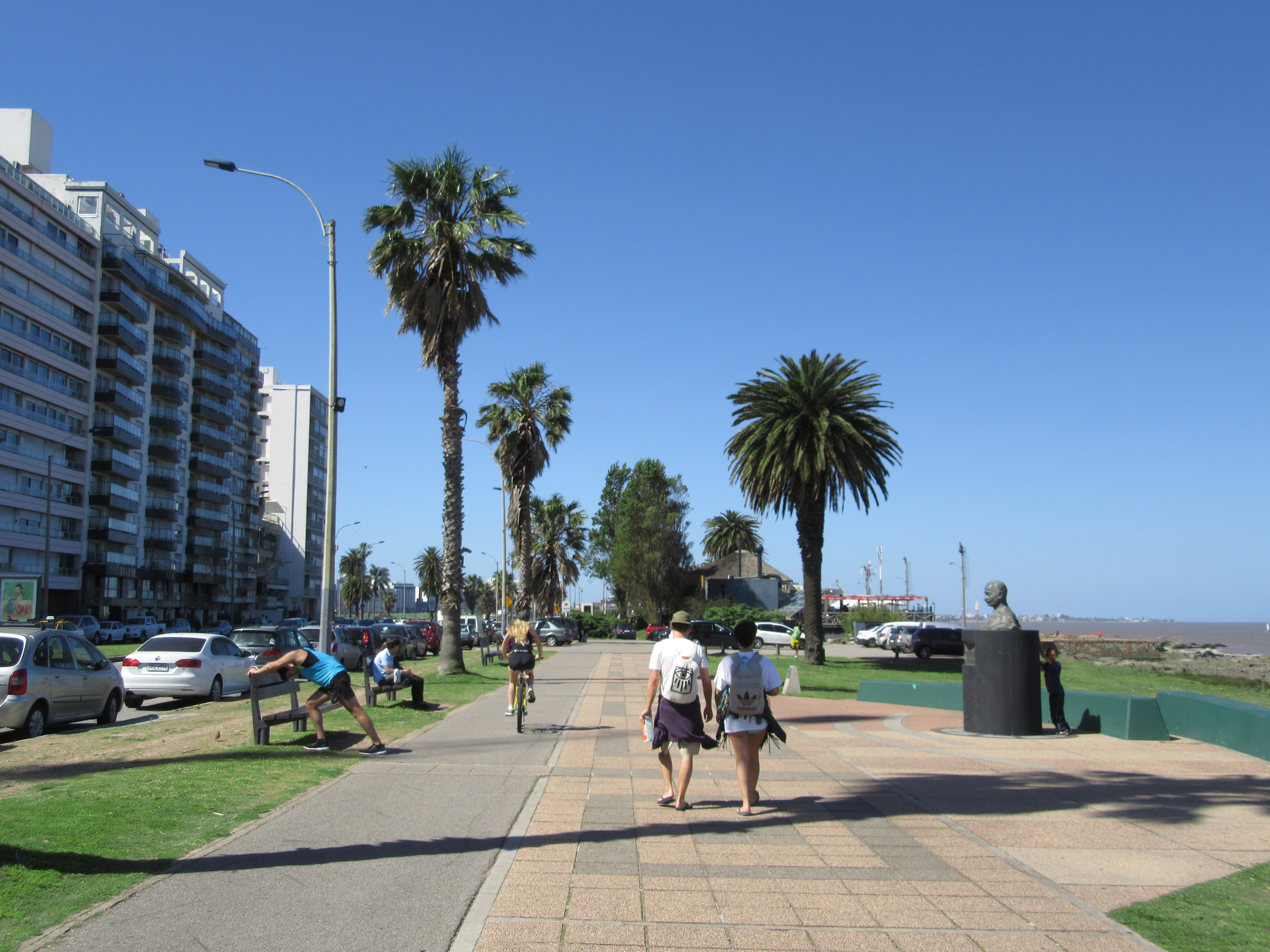
The rambla Gandhi, in Punta Carretas.

The Rambla of Montevideo is the coastal avenue that goes along the coastline of the Rio de la Plata in Montevideo, Uruguay. At a length of over 22.2 uninterrupted kilometres (13.7 mi), the promenade runs along the Río de la Plata and continues down the entire coast of Montevideo. Since most of the southern departments of Uruguay face either the Río de la Plata or the Atlantic Ocean, they all have ramblas as well. The Rambla is an integral part of Montevidean identity and has been proposed as a World Heritage site.

La Rambla, South of the Bay of Montevideo, is an environment for a wide variety of outdoor activities such as jogging, walking, biking, fishing, kite-flying, sunbathing and drinking mate. Skateboarding and roller skating are also possible in special areas for these activities. The avenue is secured by the Tourism Police Unit during the summer to keep a safe environment for tourists.

The beach is state-owned, and building anything across the rambla is strictly regulated.

== Divisions ==
The Rambla was formerly known as Rambla Naciones Unidas along its length but has now been subdivided :

=== Bay of Montevideo ===
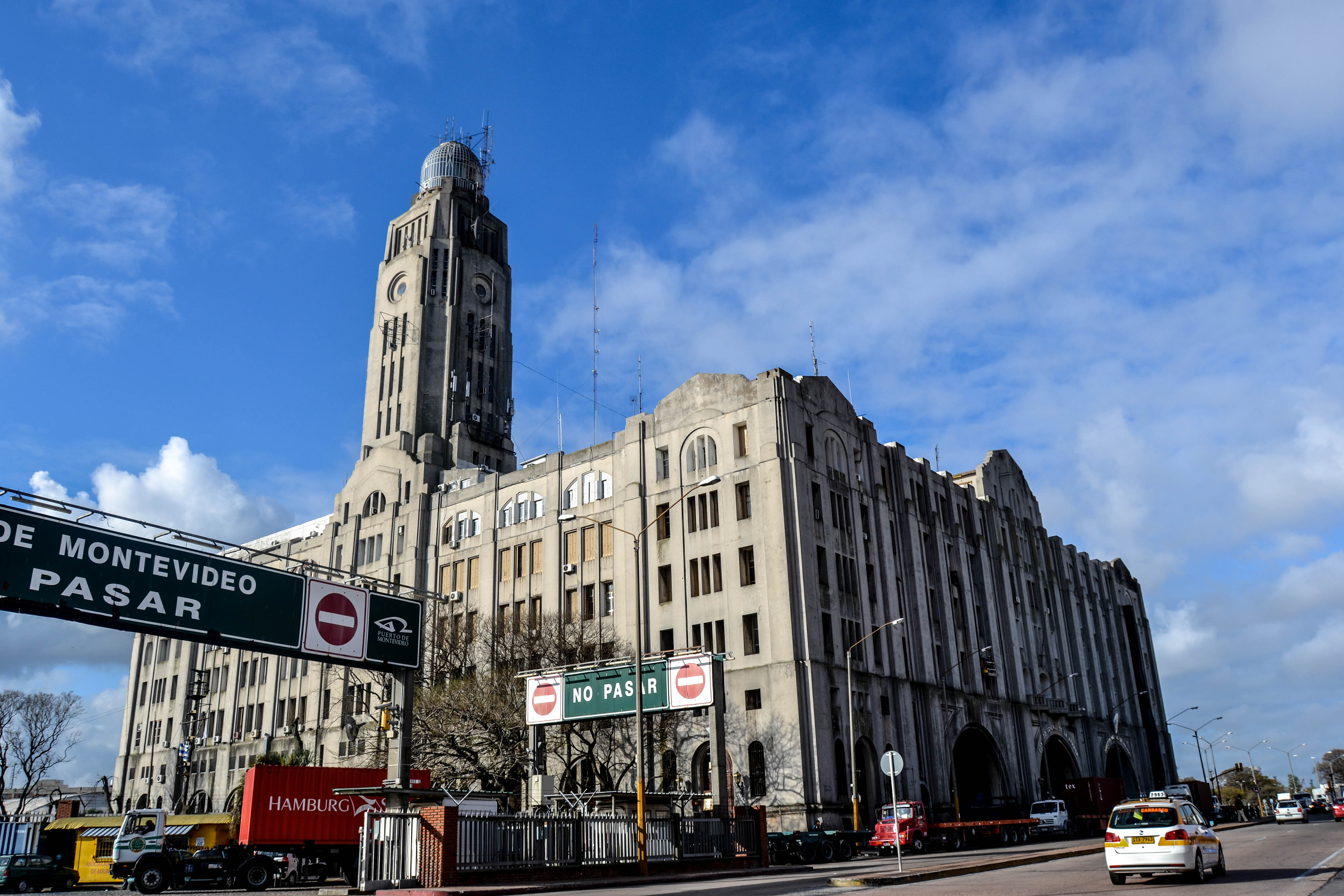
Rambla 25 de Agosto

- Rambla Baltasar Brum (Capurro & Bella Vista) starts from the new Port of Capurro, just across the Park of Capurro, running parallel to National Route 1, then crosses the industrial area of Bella Vista in a southeaster direction up to the power generation plant of UTE.
- Rambla Edison (Bella Vista) runs along the thermoelectric power plant of UTE in a southward direction.
- Rambla Sud América (Aguada) starts just north of the Telecommunications Tower (Montevideo) of ANTEL in Aguada, runs past the new train terminal in a southward direction and ends at the old Estación Central General Artigas.
- Rambla Franklin D. Roosevelt (Ciudad Vieja) starts at the front side of the old train terminal and runs in a westward direction separating part of the Port of Montevideo from the Ciudad Vieja.
- Rambla 25 de Agosto (Ciudad Vieja) starts from the historic site of the Bodegas, where a small part of the original fortifications of Montevideo is preserved, and runs southwest. Notable sites here are the Tower of Customs, just across the tourist hotspot of the Mercado del Puerto. At its end, traffic turns southeast into a short avenue called Ingenieur Monteverde up to the end of the west side on the Port of Montevideo.

=== Ciudad Vieja (South of the Bay) ===
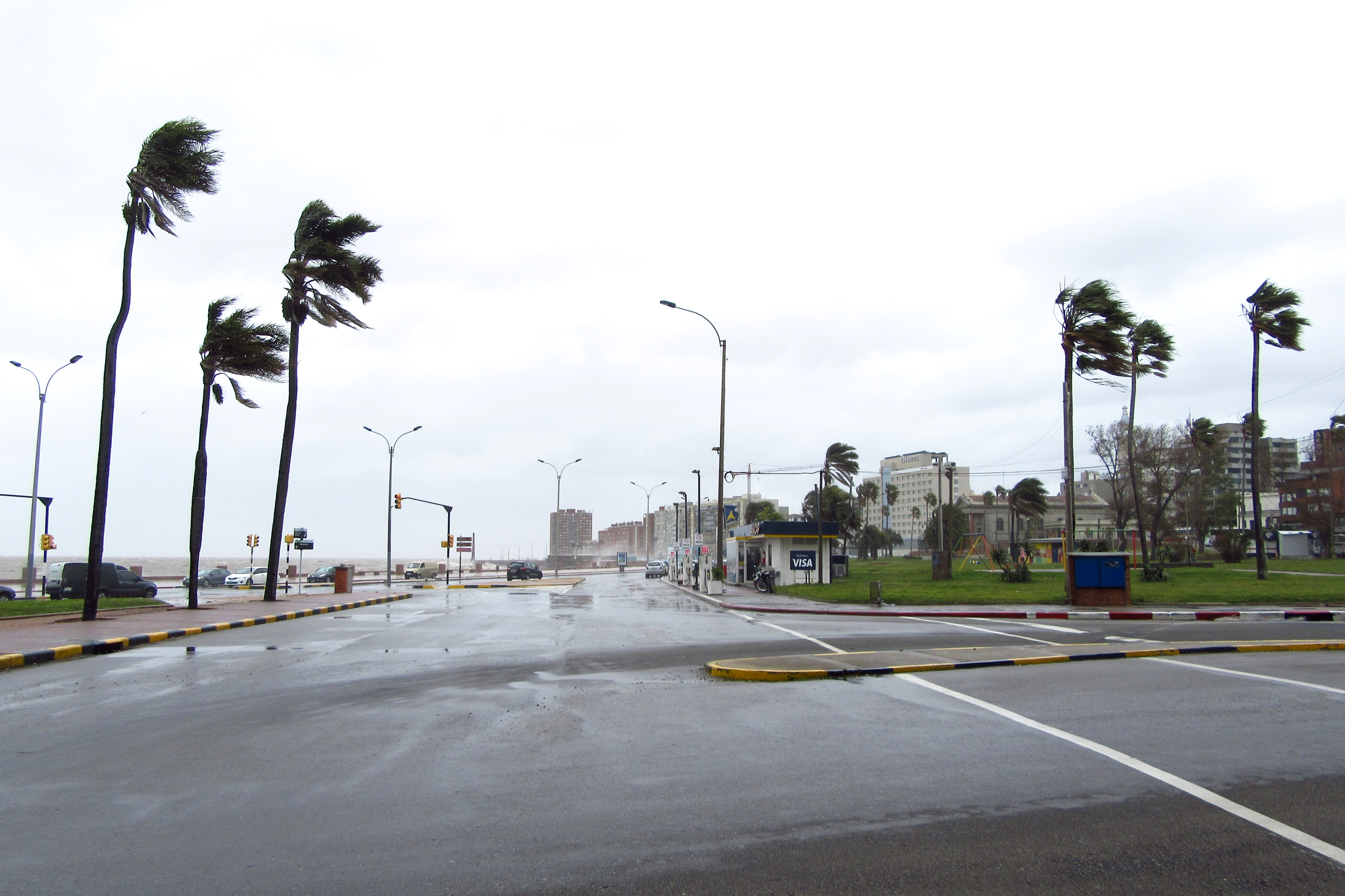
Rambla Gran Bretaña

- Rambla Sur was the name of the Rambla from the south of the Ciudad Vieja up to Parque Rodó.
  - Rambla Francia starts from the southmost breakwater of the Port, called Escollera Sarandi and ends at the Cubo del Sur, one of the few remains of the old fortifications of Montevideo, just across the Old Anglican Temple.
  - Rambla Gran Bretaña starts from the Cubo del Sur (south of Plaza España) and stops at Plaza Republica de Argentina, in front of the old Gas Company plant.

=== Barrio Sur, Palermo ===
- Rambla Sur: built at the beginning of the 20th century, it meant a dramatic change in the spatial configuration of the old outskirts of the city, including the former red zone. Now, this Rambla constitutes a vital avenue.
  - Rambla República Helénica is a small part that starts from Andes Street, the west limit of Barrio Sur, and ends across the old Gas Tank, at Rìo Negro Street.
  - Rambla República de Argentina starts from the old Gas Tank, passes along the back of the Cemetery of Barrio Sur, crosses Palermo and ends at the west limits of Parque Rodó, just before the Mercosur Building.

=== Parque Rodó, Punta Carretas ===
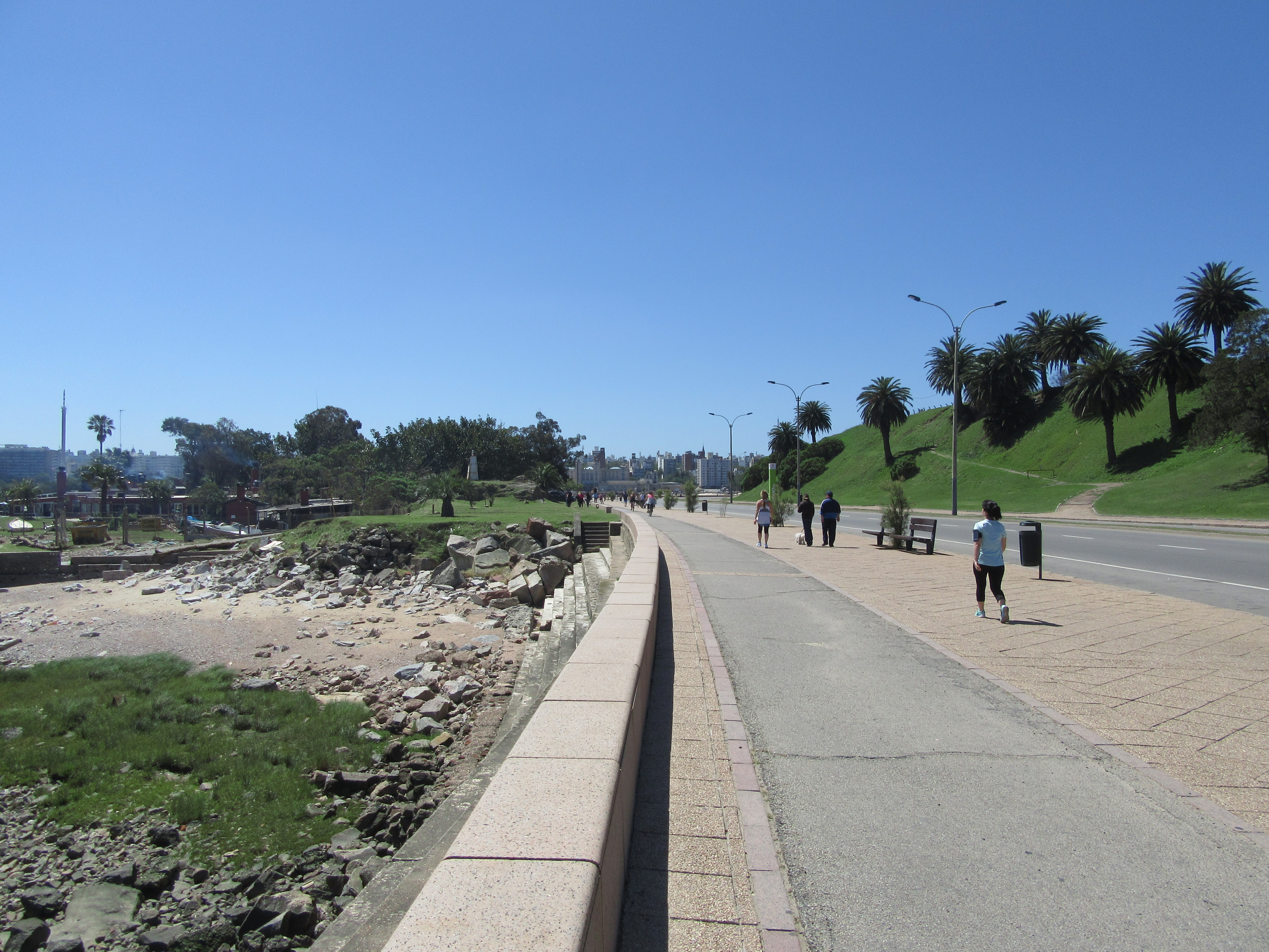
Rambla Presidente Wilson

- Rambla Presidente Wilson starts at the Mercosur Building and the north end of Ramirez Beach, goes around the west side of Punta Carretas crossing Parque Rodó (the park), the Teatro de Verano, the Holocaust Memorial and the Club de Golf Punta Carretas, and ends at the intersection with Artigas Boulevard.
- Rambla Mahatma Gandhi starts at the southmost point of the Rambla and runs in a northeast direction along the east side of Punta Carretas, up to the limits with Pocitos and the south end of the Beach of Pocitos.

=== Pocitos ===
- Rambla República del Perú starts at the south end of the beach of Pocitos and runs along the beach. Near the north end of the beach, Rambla Presidente Charles de Gaulle splits from to follow the coastline and they both run parallel to each other until it ends at the limits with Buceo.
- Rambla Presidente Charles De Gaulle after it splits from Rambla República del Perú in Pocitos, passes in front of the Naval Museum of Montevideo, runs all the way round the port of Buceo and then merges with Rambla Armenia.

=== Buceo ===
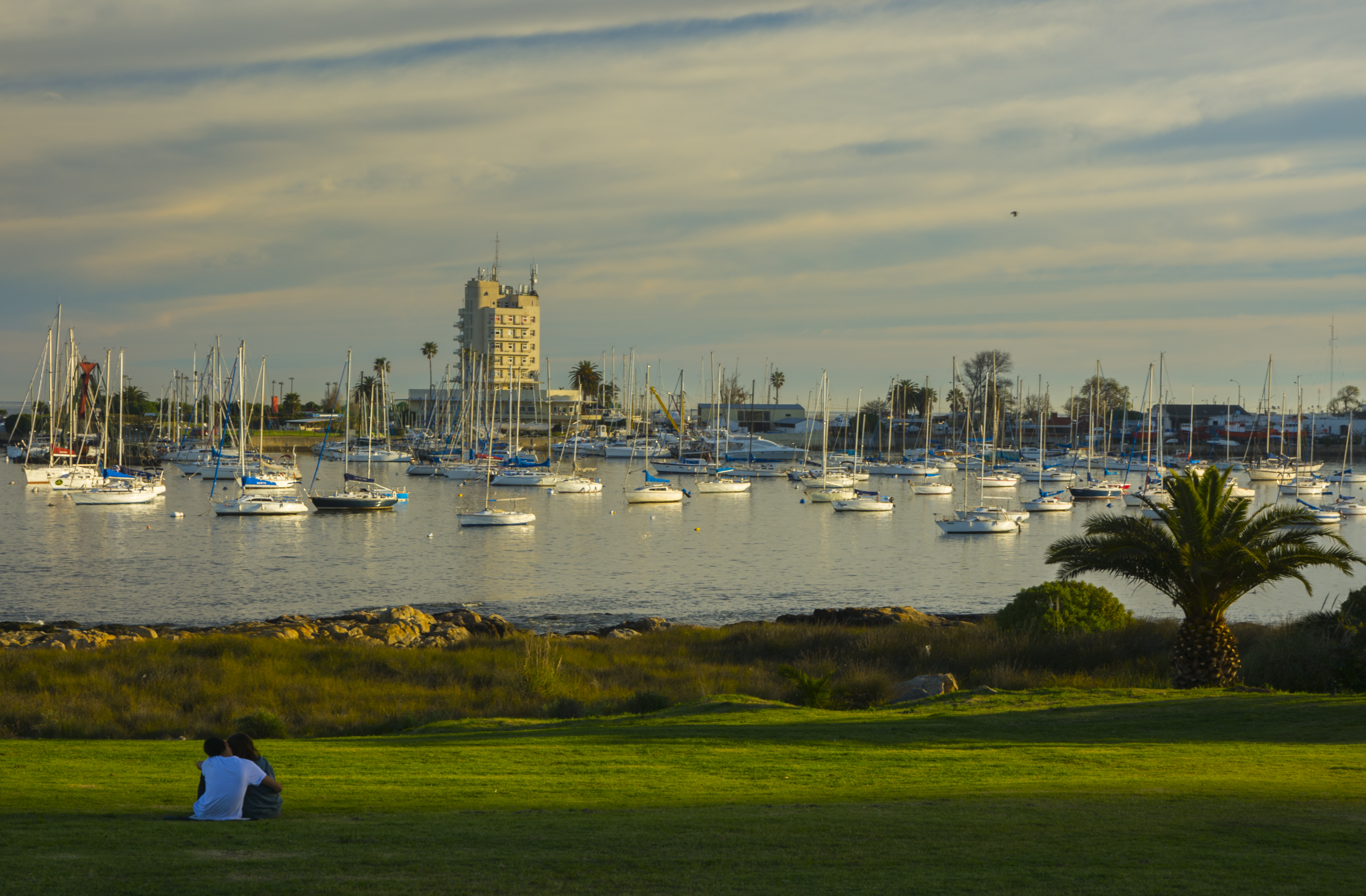
Yacht Club Montevideo in Pocitos

- Rambla Armenia starts at the west limits of Buceo, at the intersection with Luis Alberto de Herrera Avenue and just before the Edificio Panamericano, runs around the bay of the Port of Buceo and stops at the Cemetery of Buceo. Notable along its way are Plaza Armenia, the historic Adauana de Oribe, which is also a museum.
- Rambla República de Chile starts at the intersection with Tomas Basáñez Street, passes the Zoological Museum of Dámaso Antonio Larrañaga, also known as the Oceanographic Museum, runs along the Beach of Buceo and crosses into Malvín.

=== Malvín ===
- Rambla República de Chile continues into the barrio of Malvín, ending midways through the Beach of Malvín, at the intersection with Concepcion de Uruguay Avenue.
- Rambla O'Higgins starts at the above intersection and crosses into the barrio of Punta Gorda.

=== Punta Gorda ===
- Rambla O'Higgins continues into the barrio of Punta Gorda and ends where a secondary street splits from the main traffic avenue to go around the promontory of Punta Gorda, while the main traffic continues on Coimbra Avenue, which turns into Rambla República de México after the promontory.
- Rambla República de Méjico starts as the secondary street that goes around the promontory of Punta Gorda and continues as the main coastal avenue after it, crossing into the barrio of Carrasco.

=== Carrasco ===
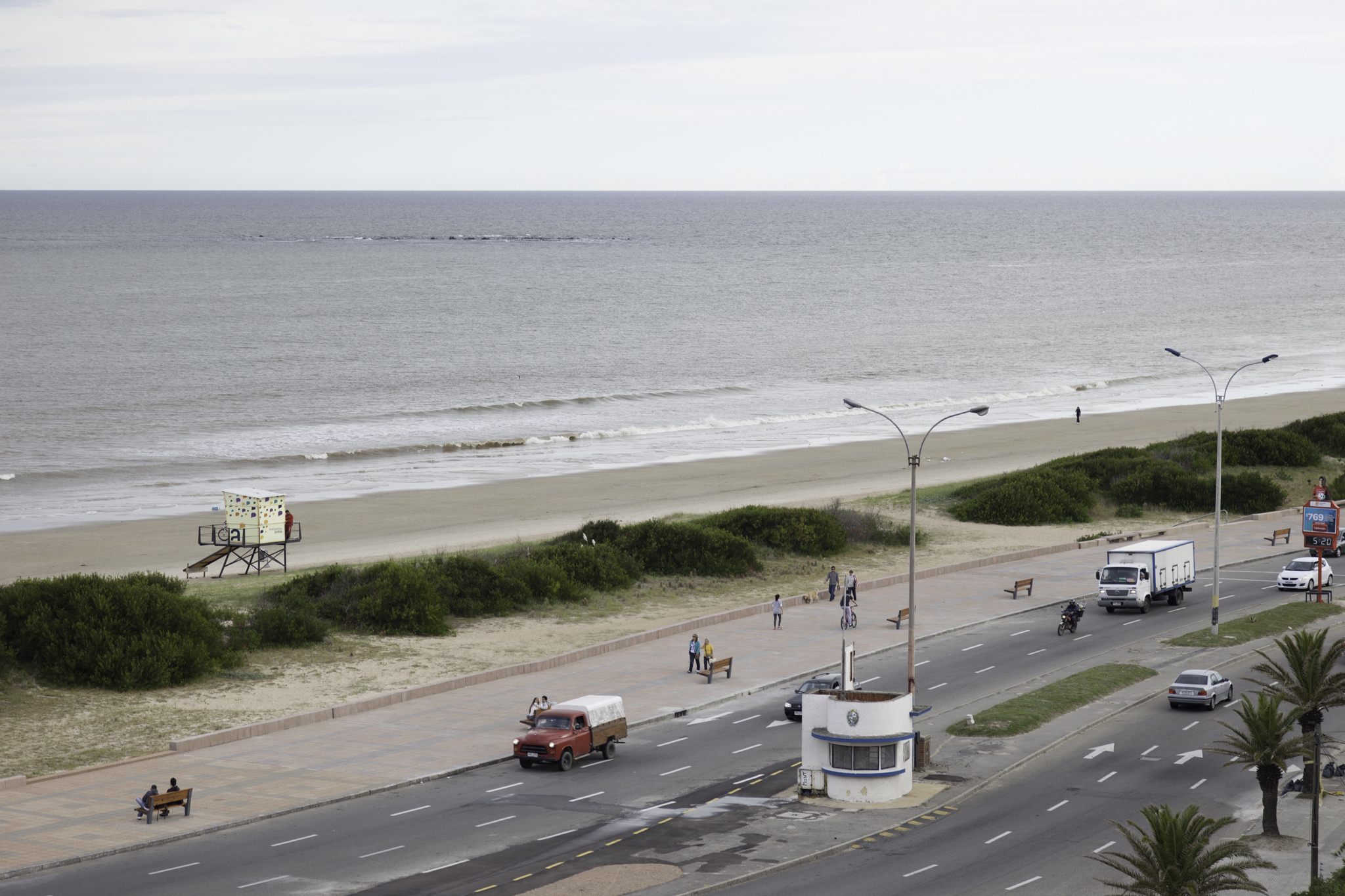
Rambla República de Méjico

- Rambla República de Méjico continues into the barrio of Carrasco running along the beach of Carrasco, passes in front of the old Hotel Carrasco and ends a few blocks east of it.
- Rambla Tomás Berreta runs along the rest of the beach of Carrasco up to the east limits of Montevideo, at the stream Arroyo Carrasco.
