= Naval Museum of Uruguay =

Uruguayan museum

Museo Naval
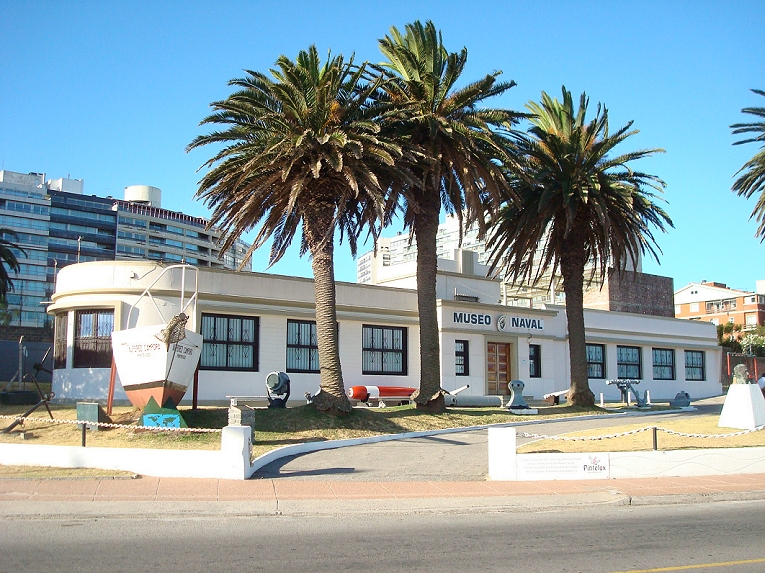
- Museo Naval in 2011.
- Formation: 26 March 1981
- Founder: National Navy of Uruguay
- Type: Maritime museums, library
- Headquarters: Uruguay; Rambla de Gaulle s/n esq. Luis Alberto de Herrera, Pocitos, Montevideo, Uruguay
- Coordinates: 34.9054°S 56.1356°W
- Director: Héctor Yori
- Website: Naval Museum of Uruguay

The Naval Museum of Uruguay (Spanish: Museo Naval de Uruguay) is located in the Rambla de Gaulle s/n, Pocitos neighbourhood, Montevideo, Uruguay.

It hosts a number of historical cannons, as well as models, photographs and memorabilia of the Uruguayan Navy. It also has a library and an archive. It is located between Playa de los Pocitos and Puerto del Buceo.

== Remodeling ==
Since 2011, the museum has begun to apply signs with Braille writing on several of the pieces. A wooden and metal path was also built to guide the blind during their visit.
