= Las Canteras, Uruguay =

Las Canteras
- Barrio
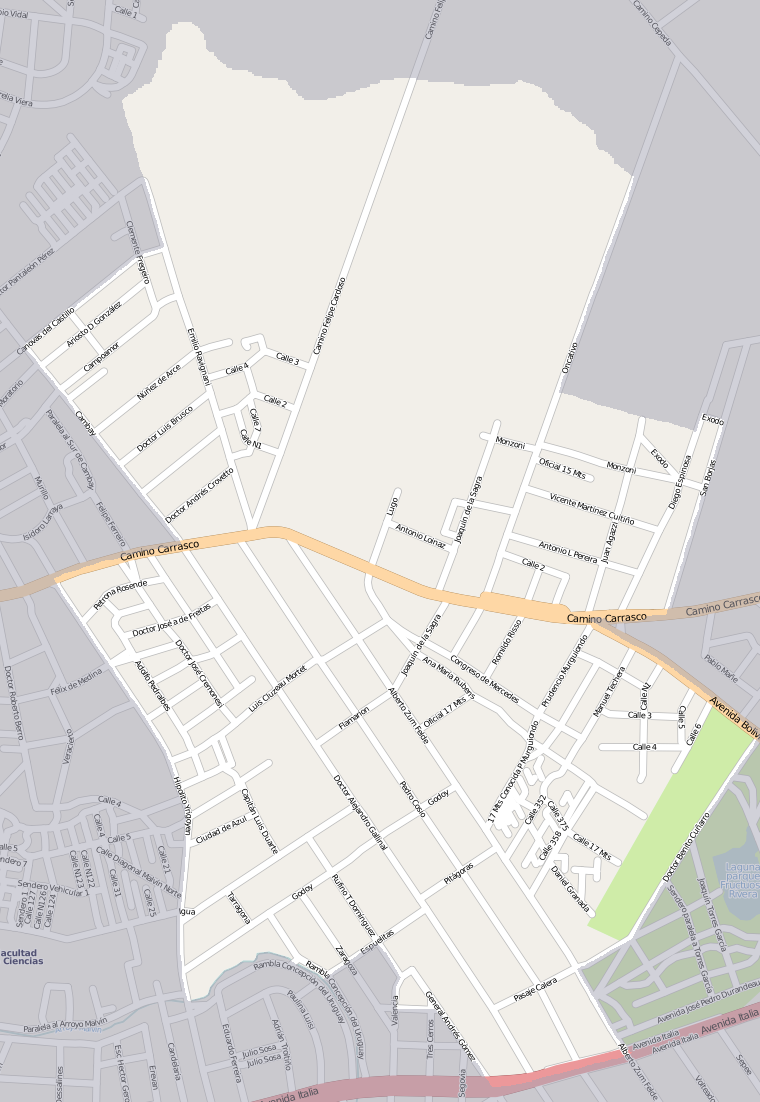
- Street map of Las Canteras

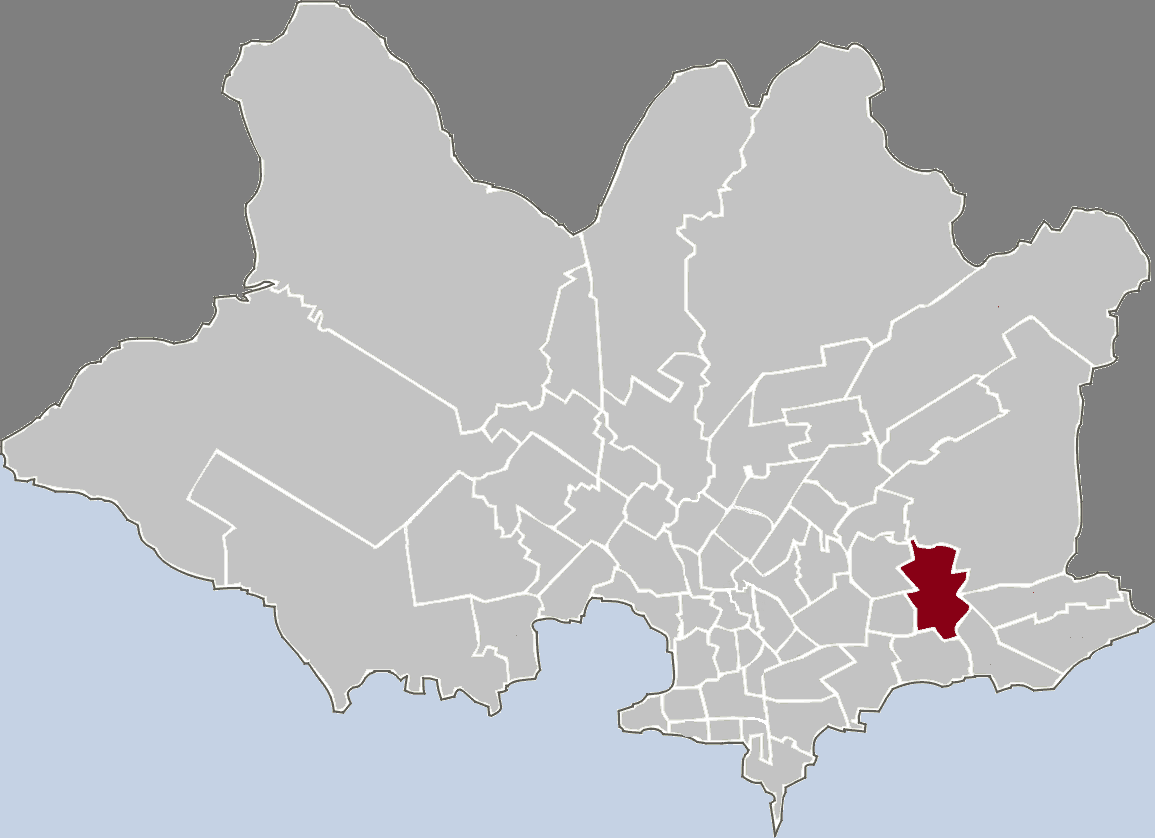
- Location of Las Canteras in Montevideo
- Coordinates: 34°52′27″S 56°6′20″W
- Country: Uruguay
- Department: Montevideo Department
- City: Montevideo

Las Canteras (or La Cruz de Carrasco) is a barrio (neighbourhood or district) of Montevideo, Uruguay.

== Location ==
This barrio borders Malvín Norte to the west, Maroñas / Parque Guaraní to the northwest, Bañados de Carrasco to the north and northeast, Carrasco Norte to the east, Punta Gorda to the southeast and Malvín to the south.

== Places of worship ==
- Church of Our Lady of Perpetual Help and St Eugene in the zone of La Cruz de Carrasco (Roman Catholic)

== See also ==
- Barrios of Montevideo
