= Malvín =

- Barrio
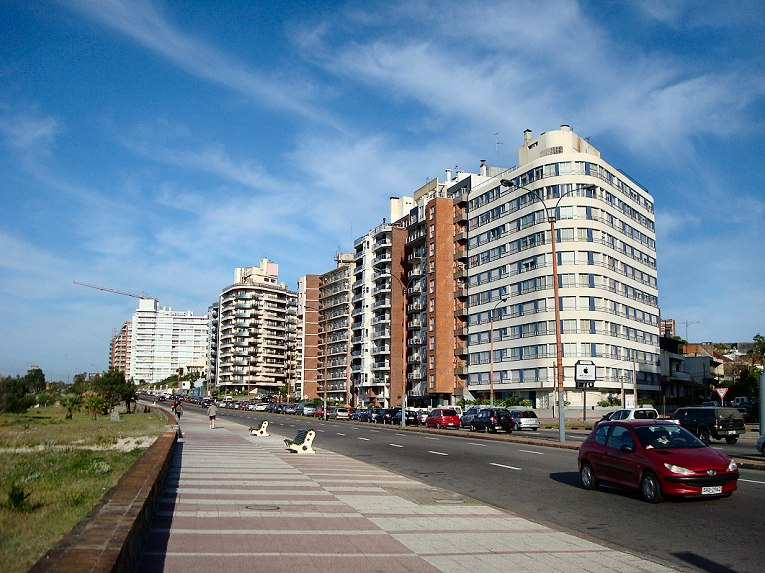
- Malvín along the coast

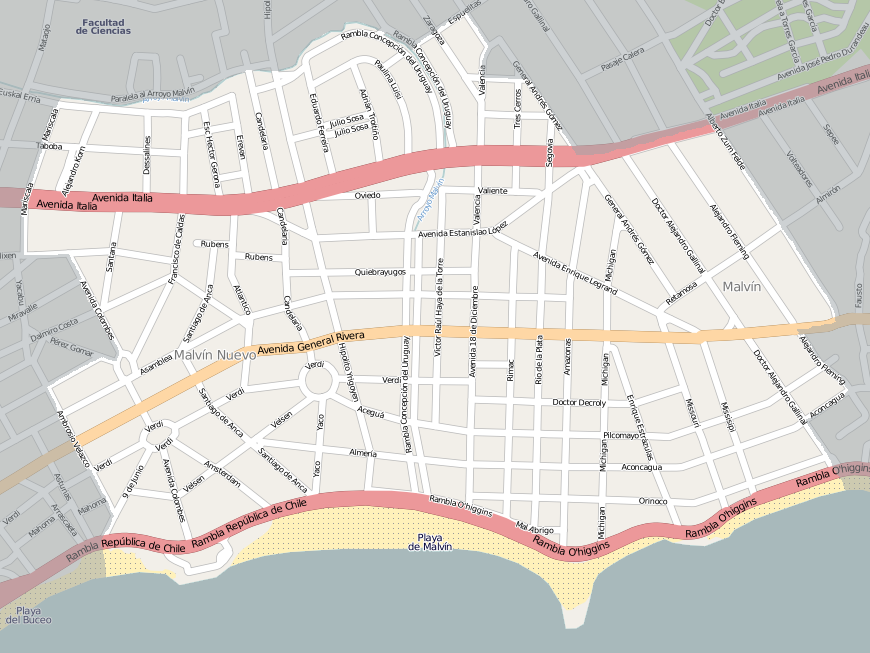
- Street map of Malvín

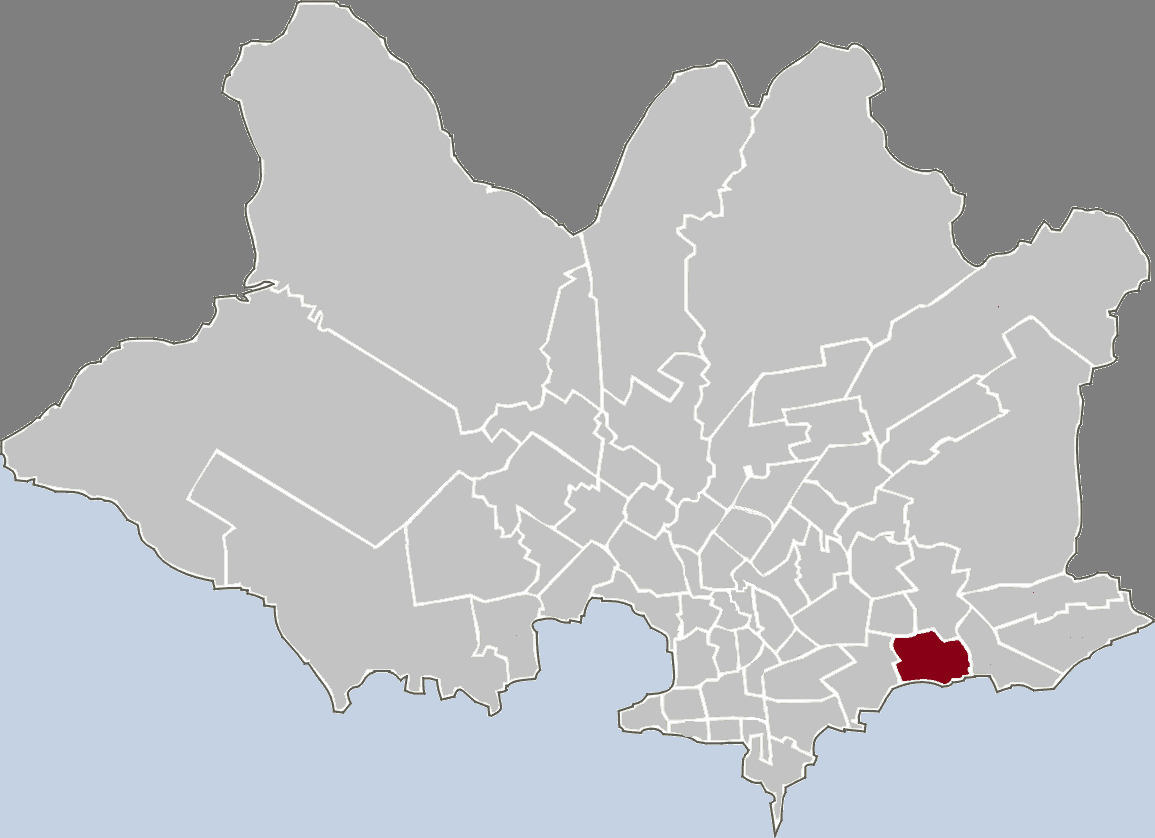
- Location of Malvín in Montevideo
- Coordinates: 34°53′31″S 56°6′23″W
- Country: Uruguay
- Department: Montevideo Department
- City: Montevideo

Malvín is a barrio (neighbourhood or district) of Montevideo, Uruguay.

== Location ==
Malvín borders Buceo to the west, Malvín Norte and Las Canteras to the north, Punta Gorda to the east and the coastline to the south.

== Economy ==
The coastal avenue along Malvín is called Rambla O'Higgins and across it is Playa Malvín, the beach of Malvín; the area was once a very popular resort. Malvín is named after Juan Balvín. Over time, the expansion of the city resulted in a major building development in the neighborhood, which increased markedly in size to become one of the fastest growing areas of the city. The price per square metre in this area is one of the most expensive in the city (along with areas like Carrasco, Punta Gorda, and Punta Carretas). The barrio includes the formerly separate barrios Malvín Nuevo and Malvín Viejo.

The Isla de las Gaviotas (Seagulls Islet) is a relevant birdwatching site.

== Education ==
The barrio contains several schools including Colegio y Liceo John F. Kennedy, Liceo 31 and Escuela Experimental de Malvín.

== Places of worship ==
- Our Lady of Lourdes Parish Church, Michigan 1645; with an added brick expansion by Eladio Dieste (Roman Catholic)
- Parish Church of St Bernadette Soubirous, Av. Italia 4318 (Roman Catholic)
- Parish Church of Jesus the Mercyful, known also as "Parroquia de Belén"; Zaragoza 1971 (Roman Catholic, Charismatic Renewal)

== Sports ==
Club Malvín is a sports club, established on January 28, 1938. The club engages in several sports: futsal, tennis, and handball, but basketball is by far the most important.

== See also ==
- Barrios of Montevideo
