= Nuestra Señora del Perpetuo Socorro y San Eugenio, Montevideo =

Roman Catholic parish church in Montevideo, Uruguay

Iglesia de Nuestra Señora del Perpetuo Socorro y San Oscar Arnulfo Romero (La Cruz de Carrasco)
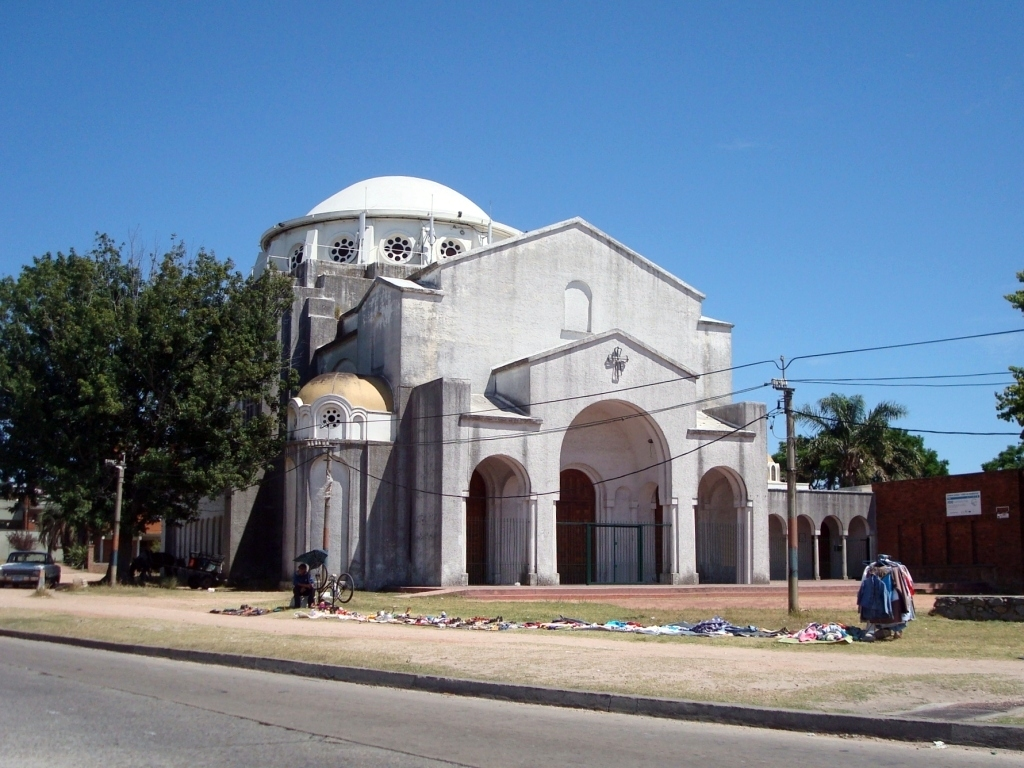

Religion
- Affiliation: Roman Catholic
- Ecclesiastical or organizational status: Parish church
- Year consecrated: 1951

Location
- Location: Juan Agazzi 2707; Montevideo, Uruguay
- Interactive map of Iglesia de Nuestra Señora del Perpetuo Socorro y San Oscar Arnulfo Romero (La Cruz de Carrasco)

Architecture
- Architect: Horacio Terra Arocena
- Type: Church
- Style: Neo-Byzantine

The Church of Our Lady of Perpetual Help and St. Eugene (Spanish: Iglesia de Nuestra Señora del Perpetuo Socorro y San Eugenio), popularly known as Iglesia de la Cruz de Carrasco (due to its location at an important crossing in Las Canteras, north-east of Carrasco) is a Roman Catholic parish church in Montevideo, Uruguay.

There was a small chapel around 1943. The present temple was built in a modern sort of Neo-Byzantine style, roughly resembling Haghia Sophia; designed by the architect Horacio Terra Arocena, it was consecrated in 1951. It is dedicated to Our Lady of Perpetual Help and saint Eugene.

The parish was established on 31 December 1949.
