= Parque Luis Méndez Piana =

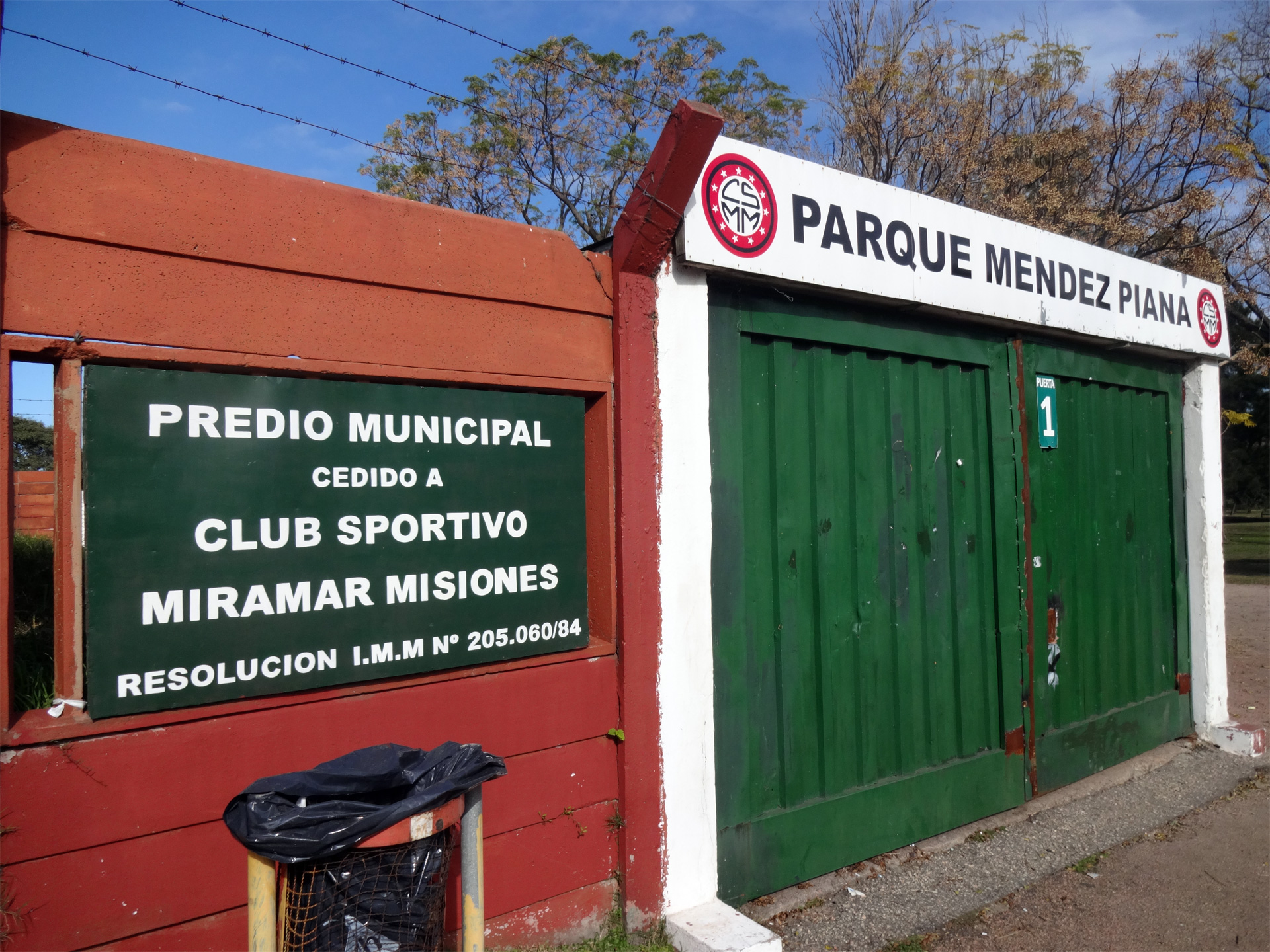
- Interactive map of Parque Luis Méndez Piana
- Location: Montevideo, Uruguay
- Coordinates: 34°53′48.73″S 56°9′11.94″W
- Owner: Montevideo Department
- Capacity: 4,000
- Surface: grass

Tenant
- Miramar Misiones

Parque Luis Méndez Piana is a multi-use stadium in Montevideo, Uruguay. It is currently used primarily for football matches and is the home stadium of Miramar Misiones. The stadium holds 4,000 people.

The stadium is the located in the Parque Batlle, between the Estadio Centenario and the Parque Palermo.
