= Carrasco Norte =

- Barrio
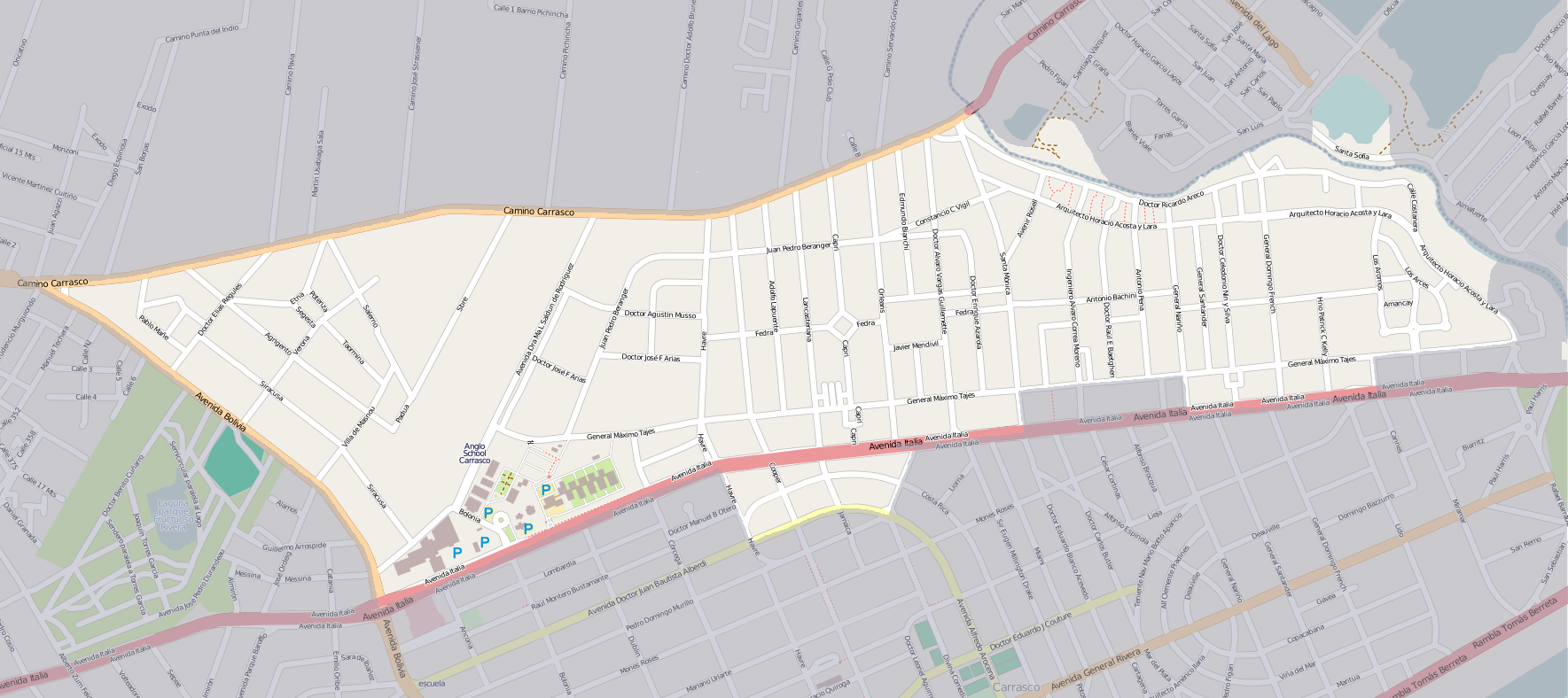
- Street map of Carrasco Norte

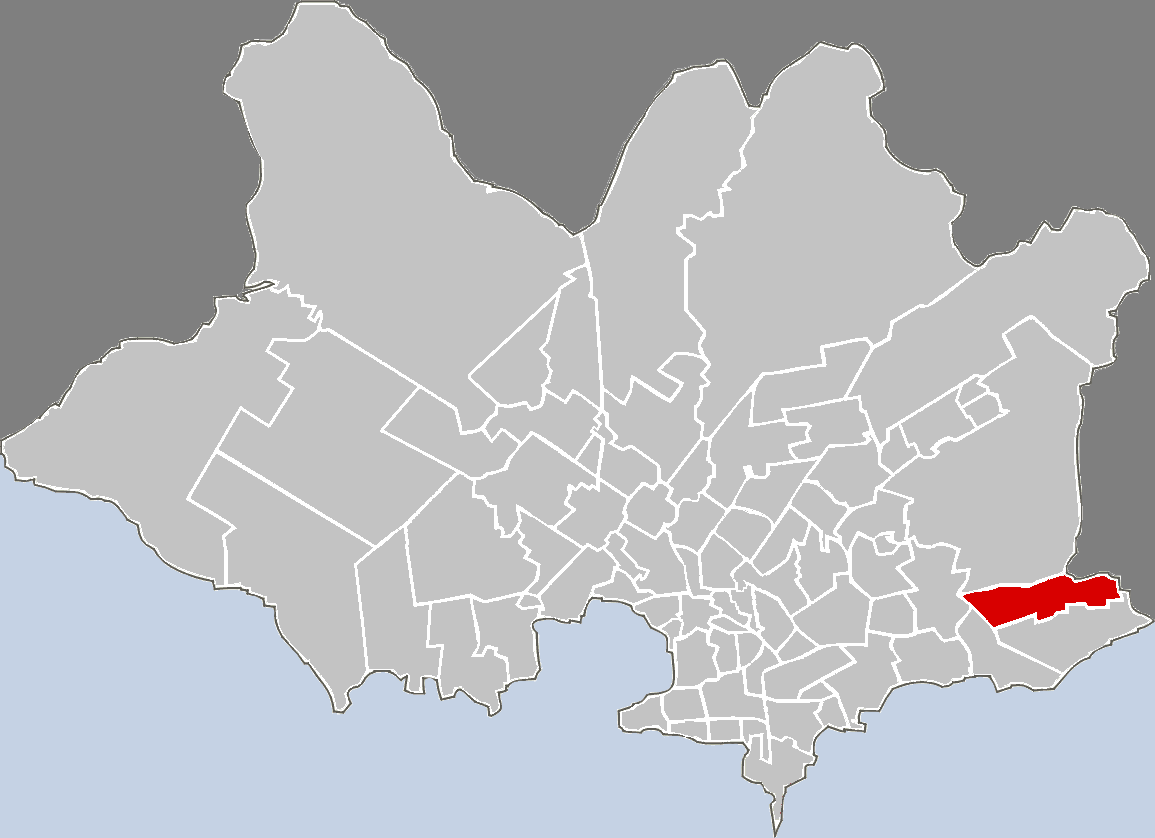
- Location of Carrasco Norte in Montevideo
- Coordinates: 34°52′33″S 56°4′1″W
- Country: Uruguay
- Department: Montevideo Department
- City: Montevideo

Carrasco Norte is a barrio (neighbourhood or district) of Montevideo, Uruguay.

== Location ==
It borders Las Canteras to the west, Bañados de Carrasco to the north, the Canelones Department to the north and to the east, Carrasco to the south and Punta Gorda to the southwest.

The Carrasco Creek separates this neighbourhood from Canelones Department.

== Educational facilities ==
Many excellent private schools which are traditionally called "schools from Carrasco" are located here, among others:

- Stella Maris College (Montevideo)
- The British Schools of Montevideo

== Places of worship ==
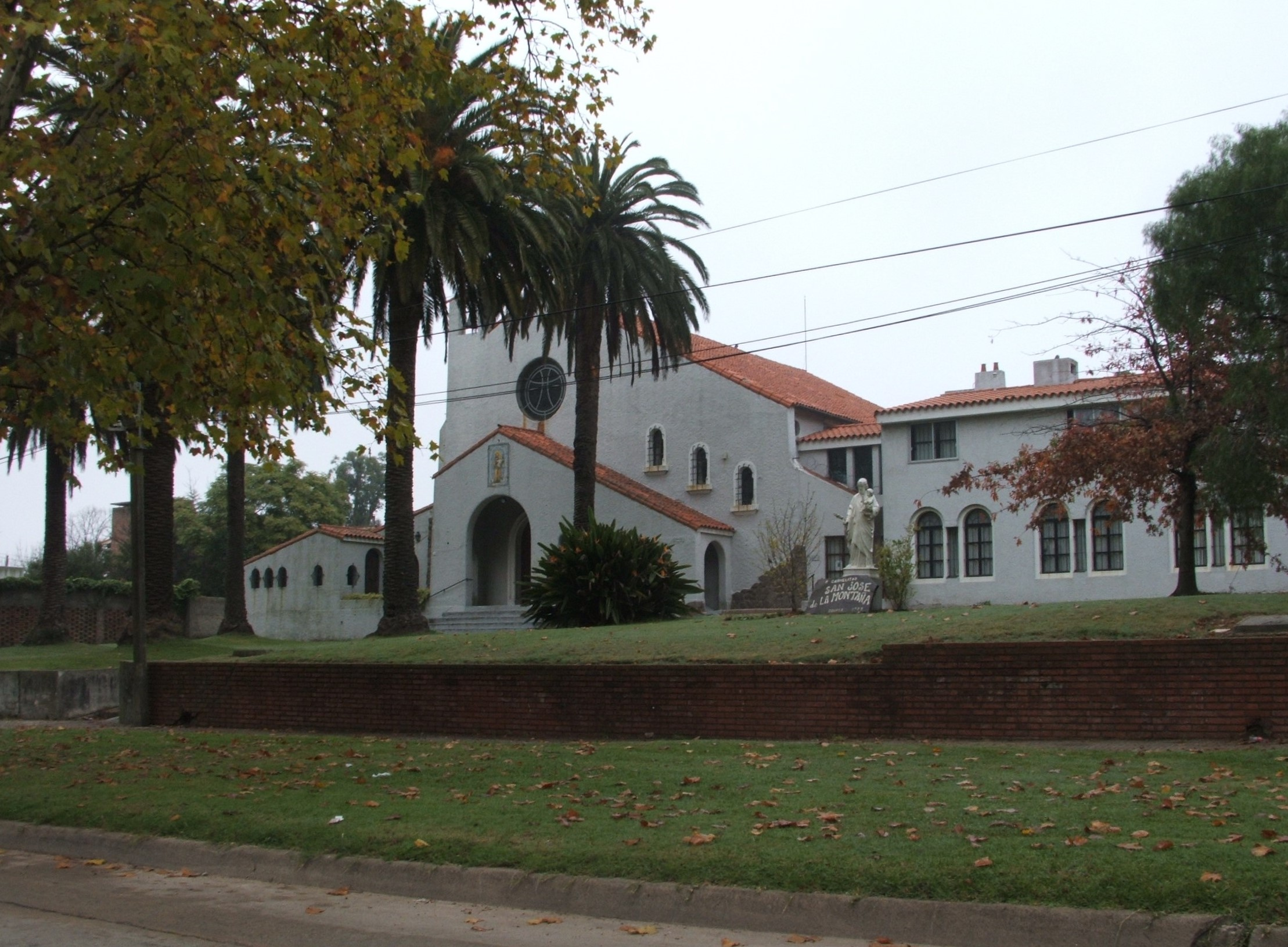
St. Joseph of the Mountain

- St. Joseph of the Mountain Chapel, Cooper 2263 (Roman Catholic, Carmelites)
- Armenian Evangelical Temple of Carrasco Norte (Armenian Evangelical)

== See also ==
- Barrios of Montevideo
