= Parque Palermo =

Stadium in Montevideo, Uruguay

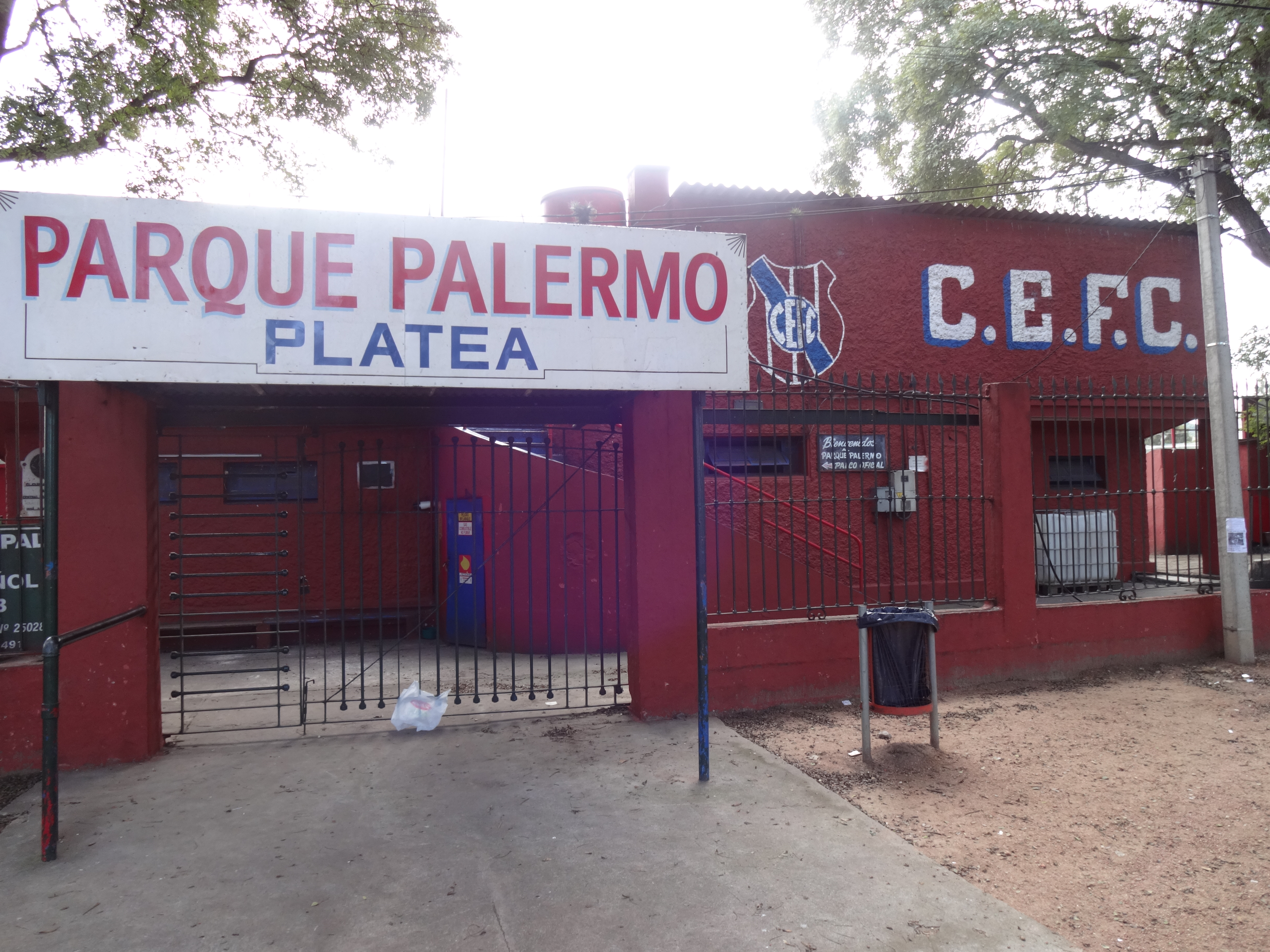
- Interactive map of Parque Palermo
- Coordinates: 34°53′52.31″S 56°9′12.80″W
- Owner: Central Español
- Capacity: 6,500
- Surface: grass

Construction
- Opened: October 31, 1937

Tenant
- Central Español

Parque Palermo is a multi-use stadium in Montevideo, Uruguay. It is currently used primarily for football matches and is the home stadium of Central Español. The stadium holds 6,500 spectators. Parque Palermo is located within Parque Batlle, close to the Estadio Centenario and the Parque Luis Méndez Piana.
