= Punta Gorda, Montevideo =

Punta Gorda
- Barrio
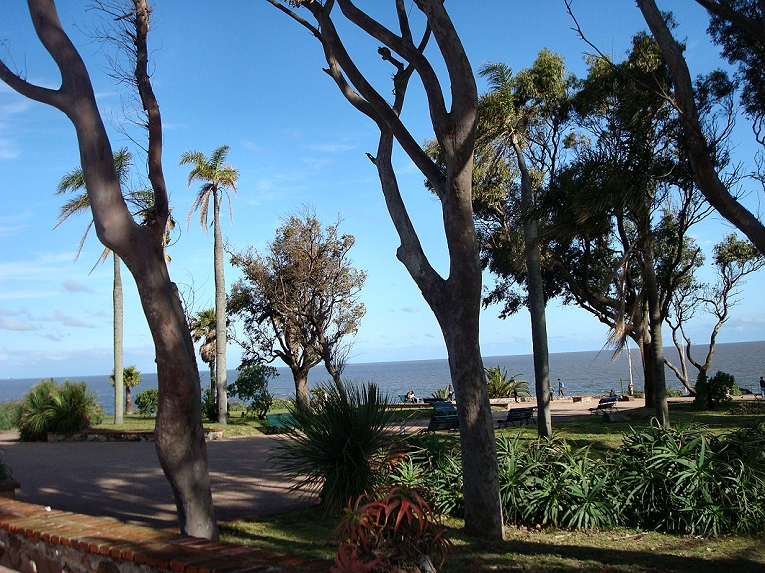
- Plaza de la Armada

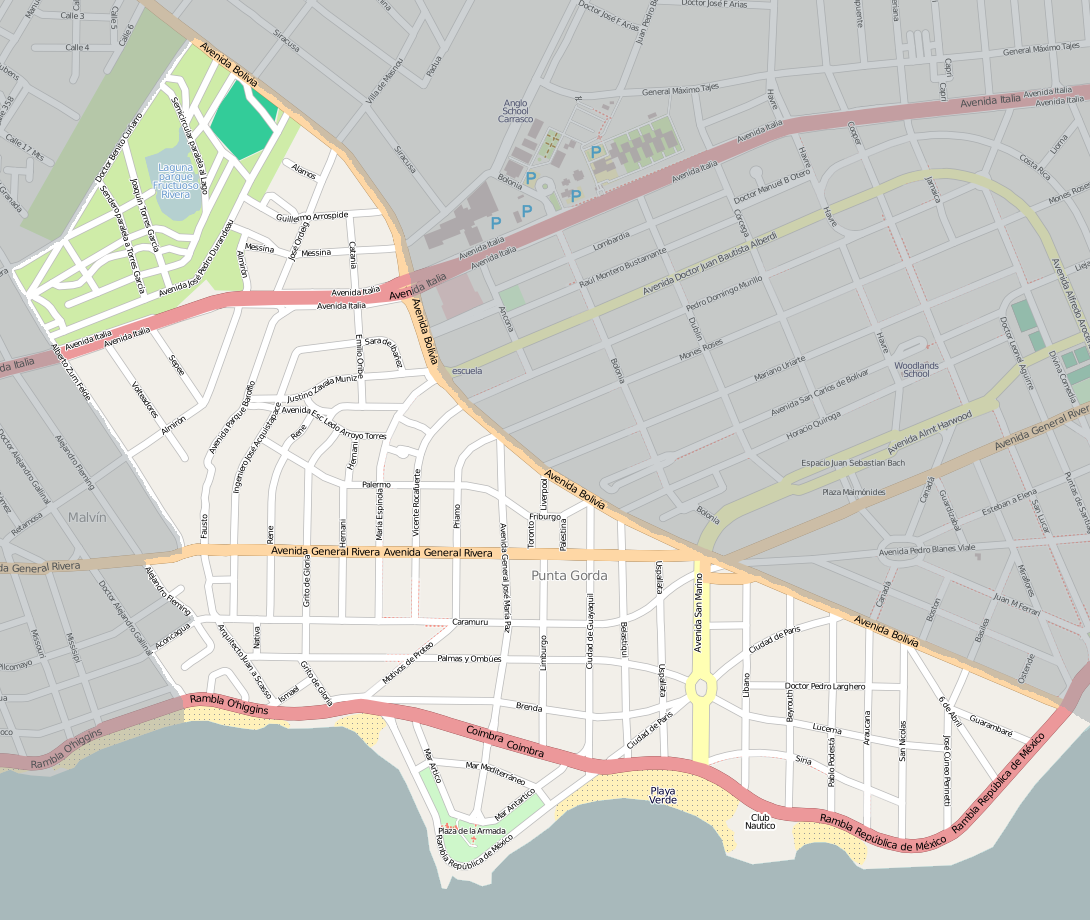
- Street map of Punta Gorda

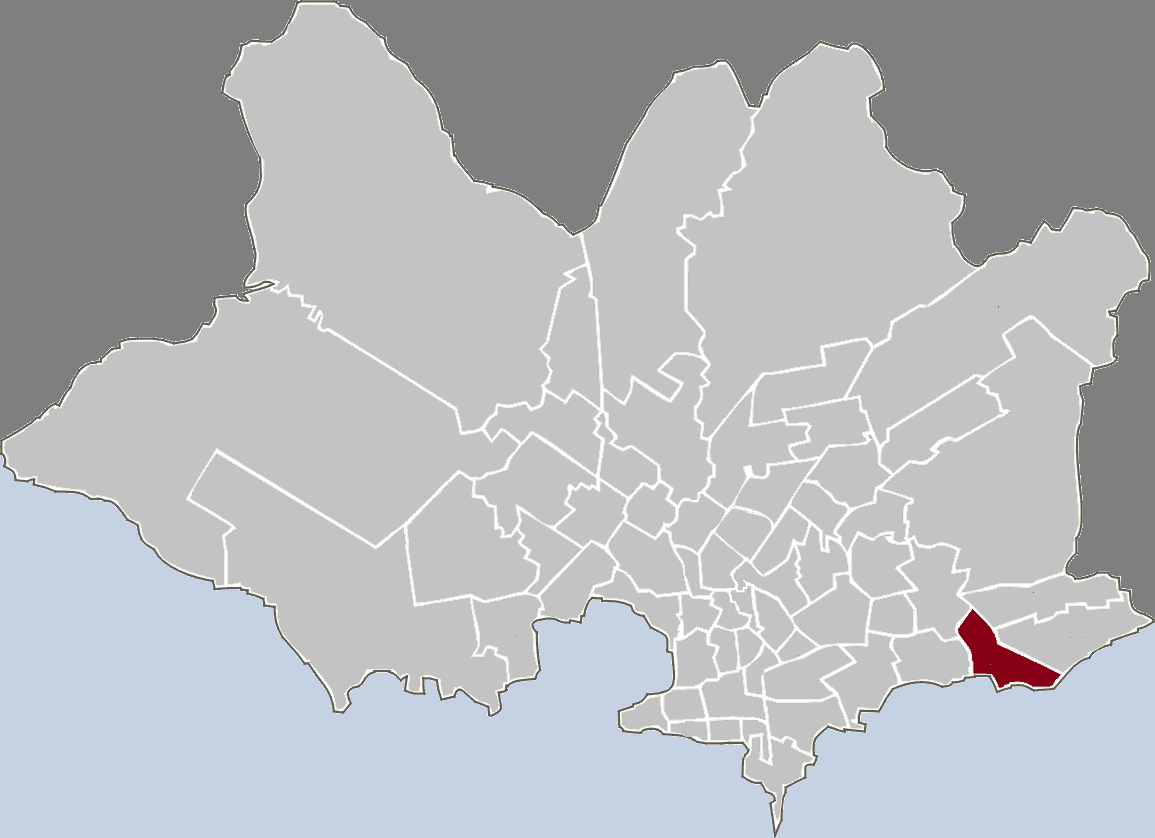
- Location of Punta Gorda in Montevideo
- Coordinates: 34°53′30″S 56°4′55″W
- Country: Uruguay
- Department: Montevideo Department
- City: Montevideo

Punta Gorda is a barrio (neighbourhood or district) of Montevideo, Uruguay. It takes its name from the promontory of Punta Gorda.

== Location ==
It borders Malvín to the west, Las Canteras to the northwest, Carrasco Norte and Carrasco to the northeast and the coastline to the south. The coastal avenue along Punta Gorda takes on the names Rambla O'Higgins and Rambla República de Méjico, across which are the beaches Playa de los Ingleses and Playa Verde.

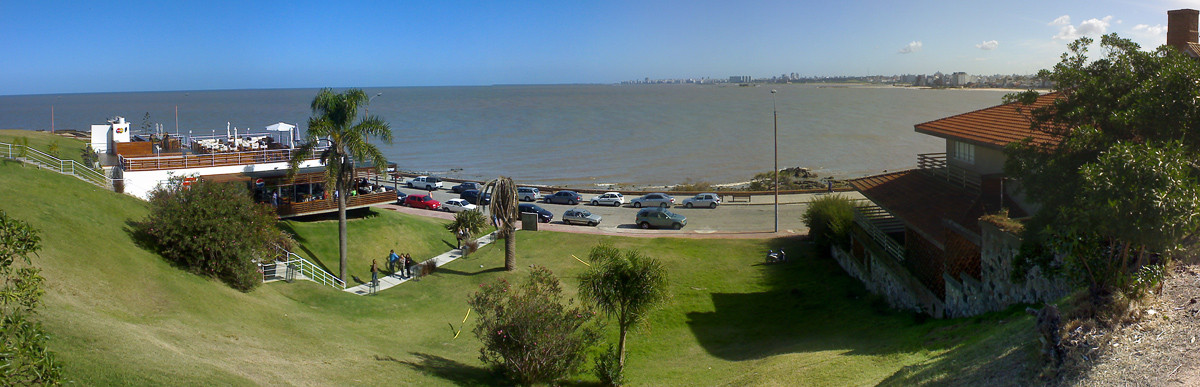
Punta Gorda, Montevideo

== Landmarks ==
On top of the promontory is a square which is also a park, the Plaza de la Armada (formerly known as Plaza Virgilio) and it is a tourist hotspot. Another notable sight is the Molino de Perez, a historic watermill, now housing a cultural centre.

== Educational facilities ==
- Colegio y Liceo Santa Rita, Toronto 1597 (private, Roman Catholic, Augustinians)

== Places of worship ==
- Parish Church of St Rita of Cascia, Friburgo 5763 (Roman Catholic, Augustinians)

== Gallery ==
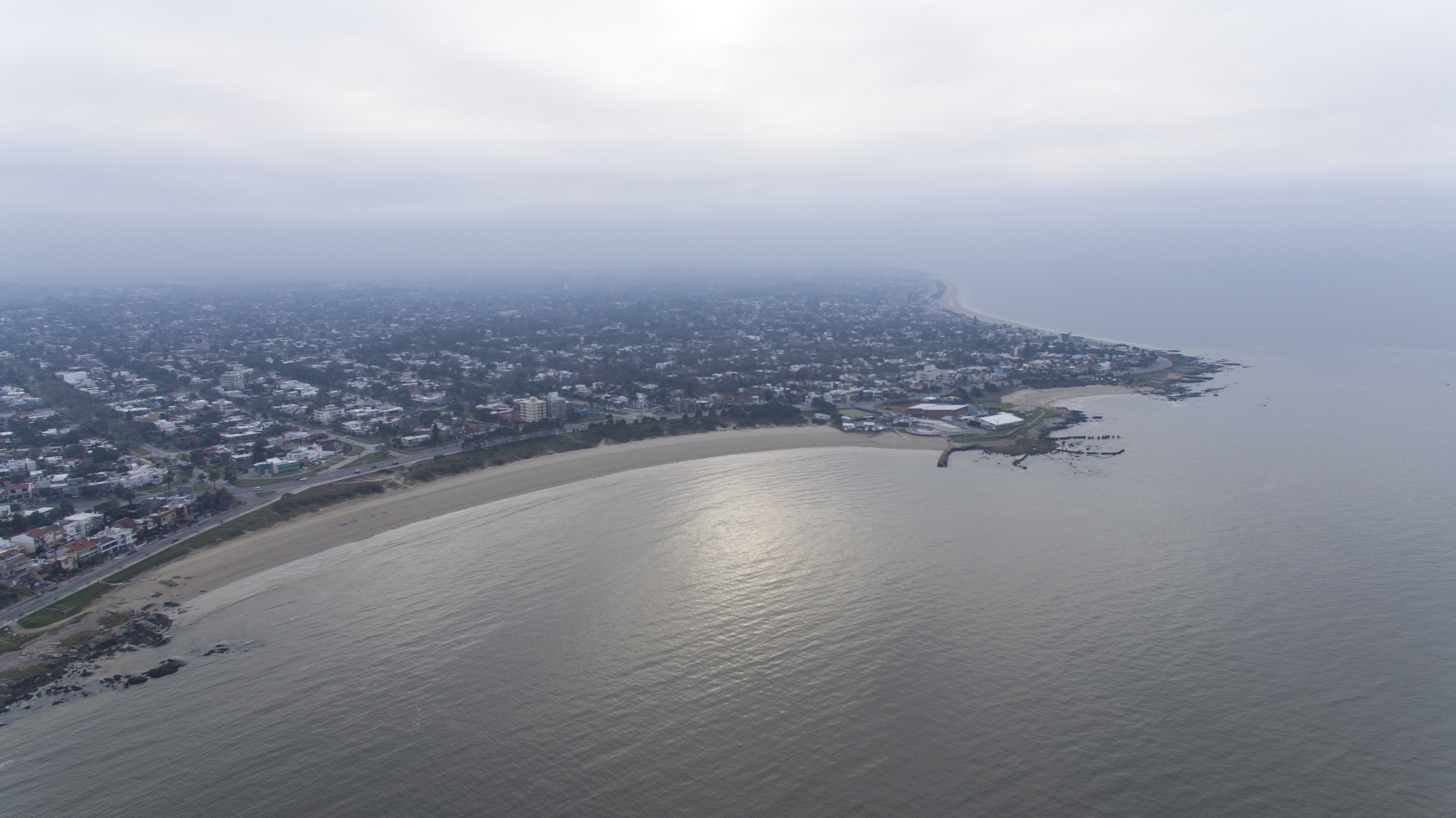
Punta Gorda beach, aerial view, Montevideo, Uruguay

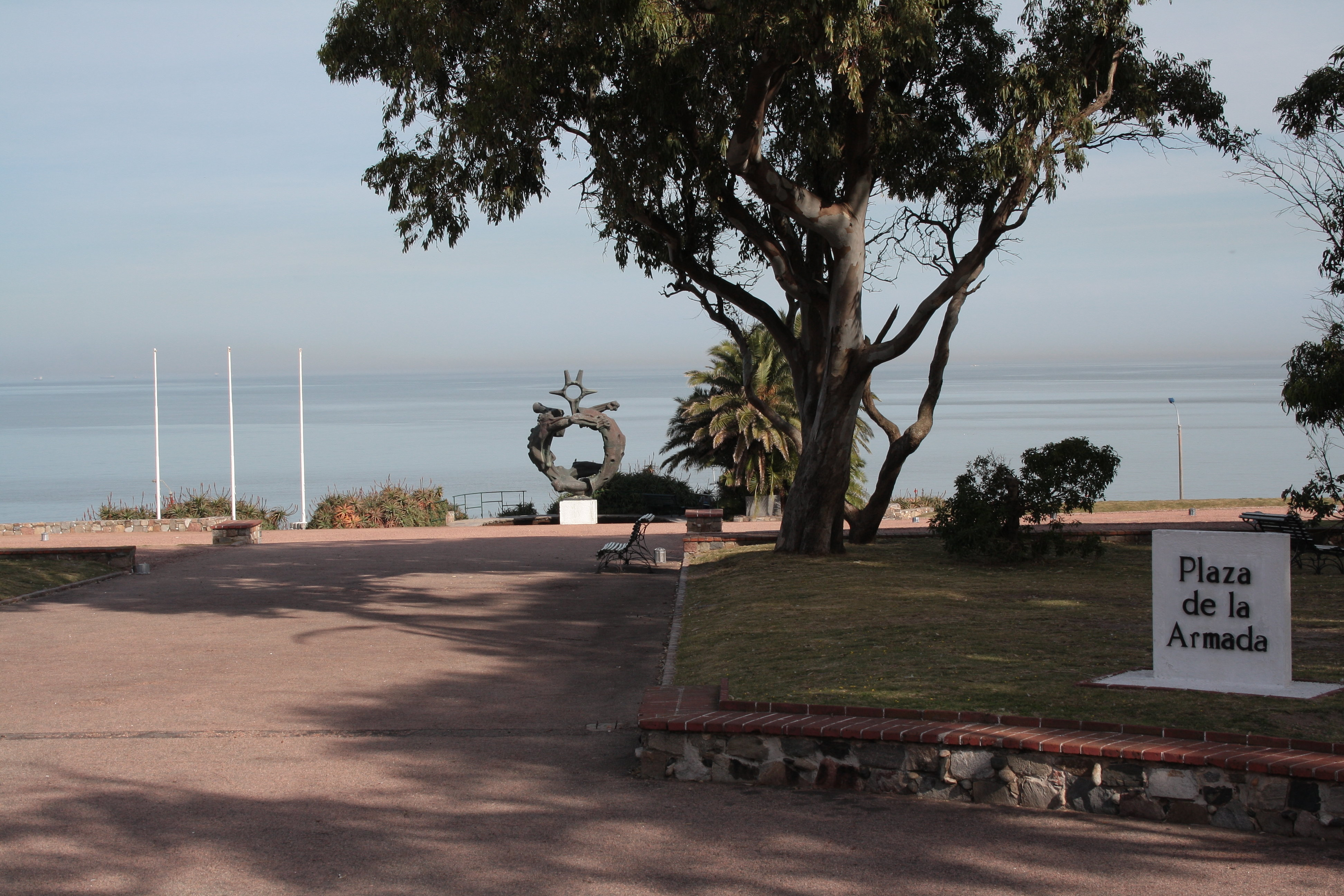
Plaza de la Virgilio

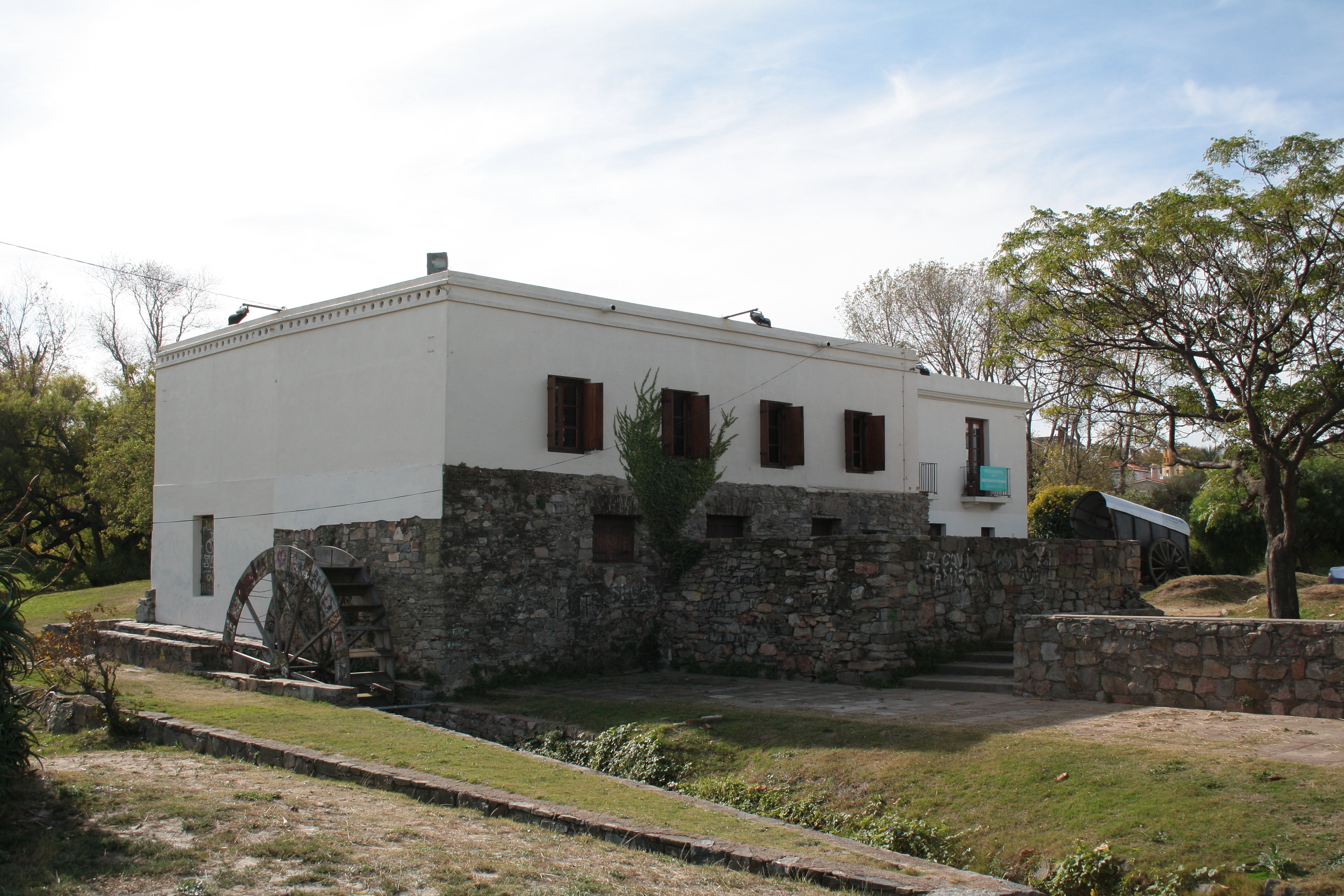
Molino de Perez

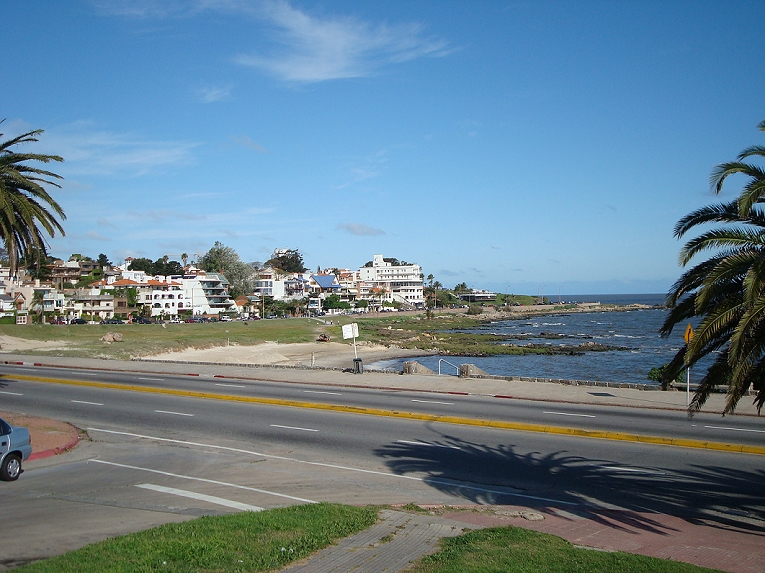
Rambla in Punta Gorda

== See also ==
- Barrios of Montevideo
