= Edificio Panamericano =

Panamericano Building
- Edificio Panamericano
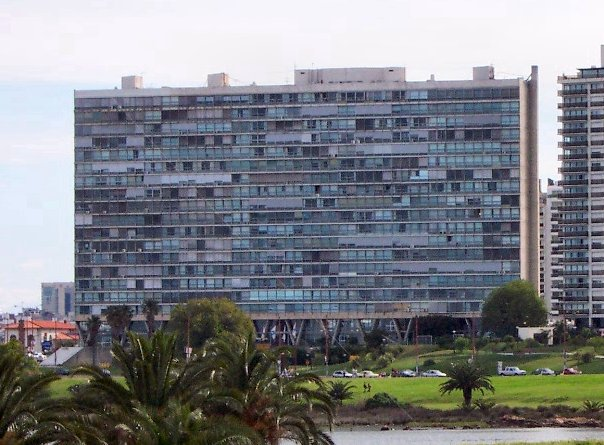
- Interactive map of the Panamericano Building area

General information
- Type: Apartments
- Architectural style: Rationalism
- Location: Luis Alberto de Herrera 1042, Montevideo (Uruguay)
- Coordinates: 34°54′32″S 56°8′5″W
- Construction started: 1960
- Completed: 1964
- Owner: Rambla Horizontal S. A.

Height
- Height: 50 metres (160 ft)

Technical details
- Structural system: Reinforced concrete
- Floor count: 17

Design and construction
- Architect: Raul A. Sichero Bouret
- Structural engineer: Jorge Bermudez, Mario Simeto

The Panamericano Building is a housing construction located in the area Buceo of Montevideo, Uruguay. It is located on the coast, across the Port of Buceo and on the border with the neighbourhood of Pocitos.

It was designed and constructed by the architect Raul A. Sichero Bouret. This building stands out by the form of its supports (in V) of double height and by its facade.

It was declared a building of "Municipal Interest" by the Mayor of Montevideo in 1995.
