= Buceo =

- Barrio
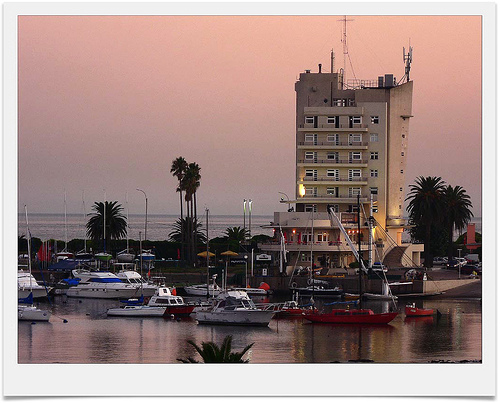
- Puerto del Buceo

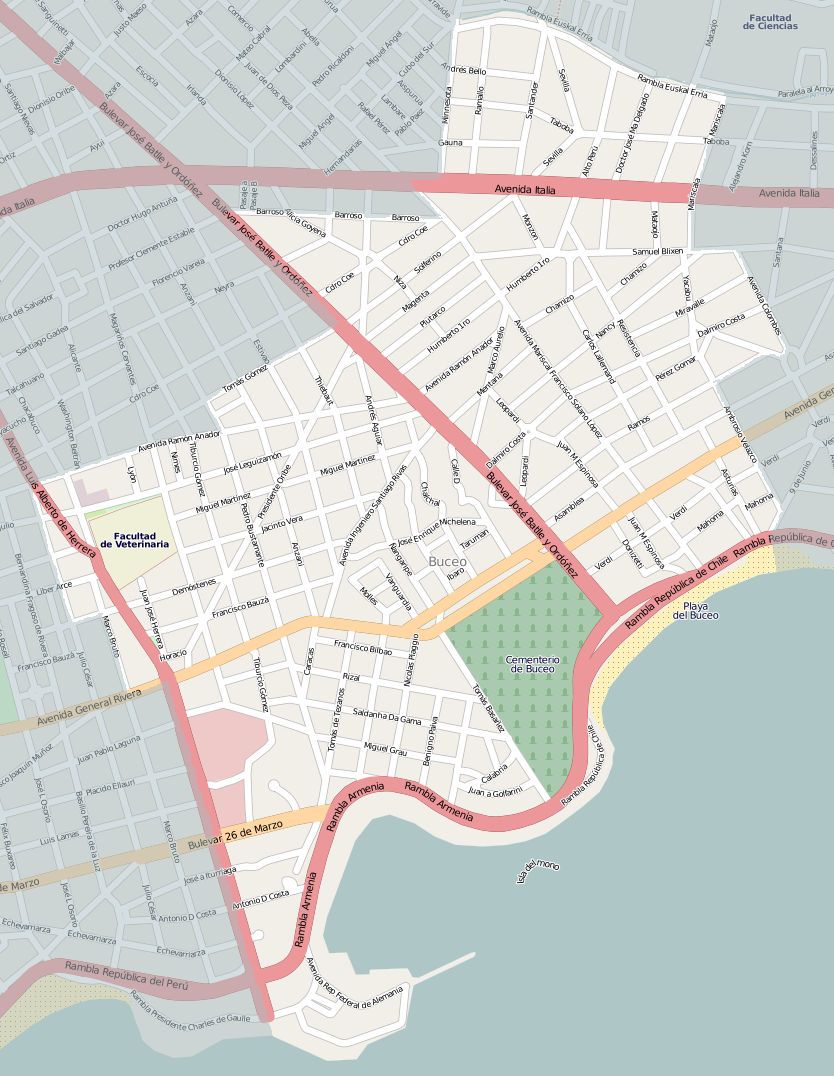
- Street map of Buceo

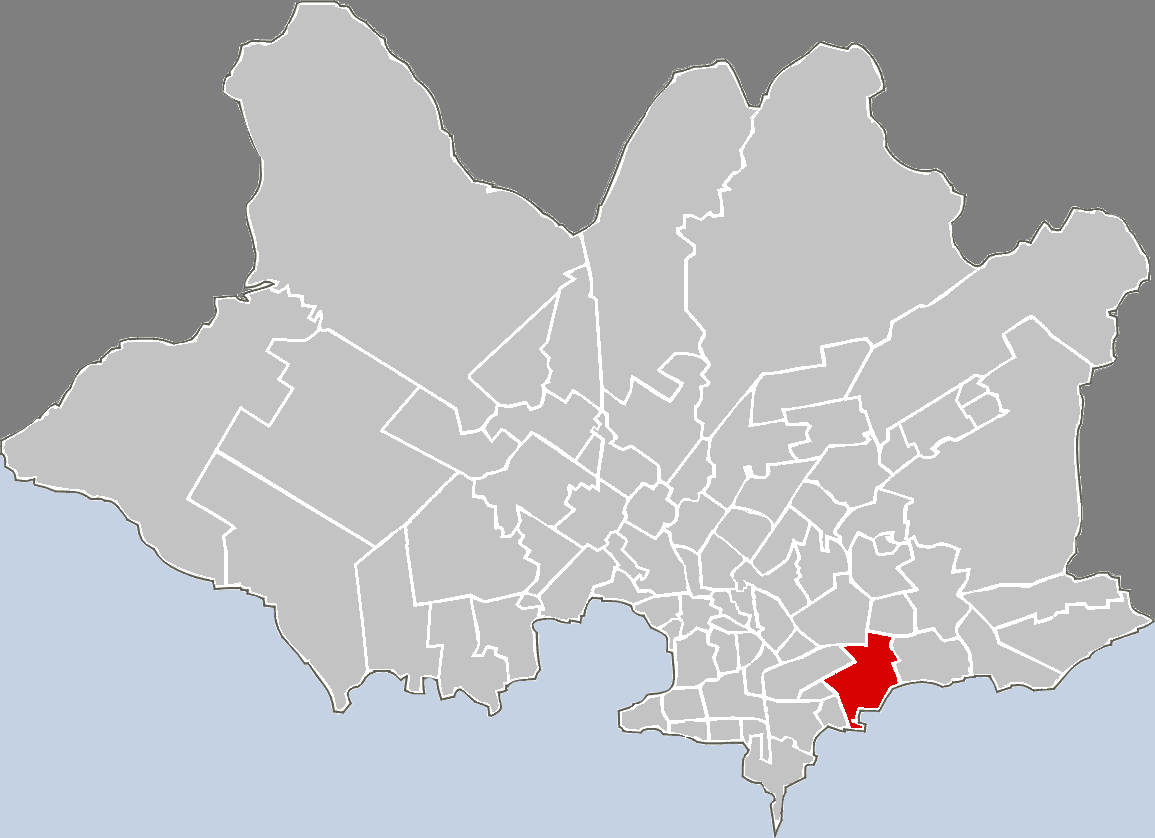
- Location of Buceo in Montevideo
- Coordinates: 34°54′0″S 56°7′59″W
- Country: Uruguay
- Department: Montevideo Department
- City: Montevideo

Buceo is a barrio (neighbourhood or district) in Montevideo, Uruguay. Buceo borders Pocitos and Villa Dolores to the west, Parque Batlle, Unión and Malvín Norte to the north, Malvín to the east and the coastline to the south.

== Description ==
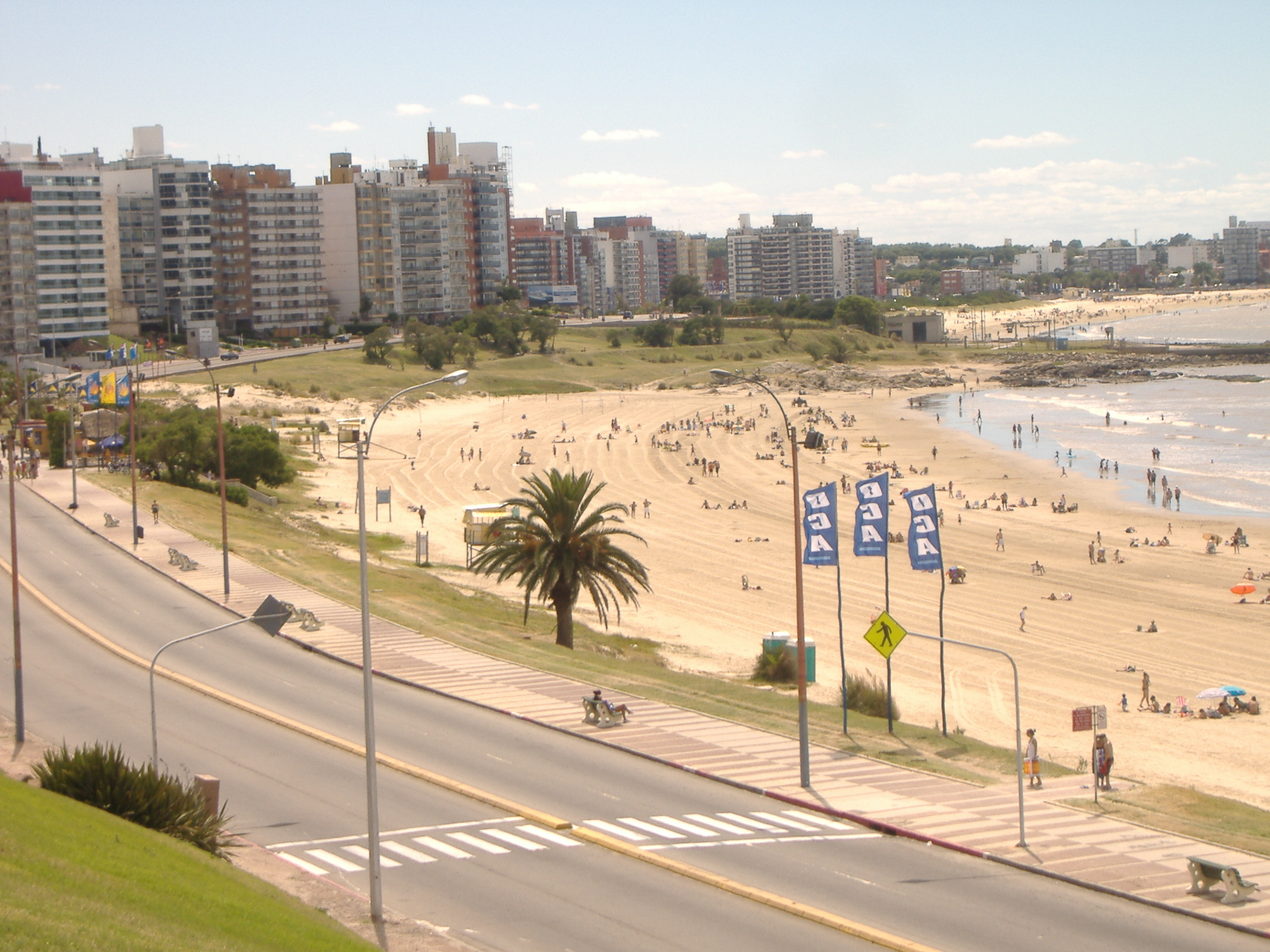
Buceo's beach view

The Rambla of Montevideo coastal avenue takes on the names Rambla Armenia and Rambla República de Chile along Buceo. Across it is the Port of Buceo and opposite to it, a building with a pointed tower, which houses the Oceanographic Museum. Beyond this stretches the beach of Buceo.

Buceo is home to the biggest shopping mall of the city, the Montevideo Shopping, and to the World Trade Center Montevideo.

An architecturally important building is the Edificio Panamericano, opposite the Port of Buceo. The port is home to Montevideo's principal marina and has a beach by the same name. It is prime for hosting sailing racing events and has in the past.

In October 2012 a monumental statue of the Korean art project Greetingman was unveiled in Buceo near the seashore.

== Notable people ==
- Alberto Domínguez (1934–2001), Uruguayan-born Australian victim of the September 11 attacks; he was a passenger on board American Airlines Flight 11. Grew up in Buceo.

== Educational facilities ==
- Lycée Français de Montevideo (private, bilingual)

== Places of worship ==
- Parish Church of St. Peter Apostle, José Leguizamón 3684 (Roman Catholic)

== Noted historical feature ==
At the Buceo Cemetery, the Uruguayan Civil War and National (blanco) party leader Aparicio Saraiva (d. 1904) was buried.

Across the street is The British Cemetery, which was founded in 1828.
