= Carrasco, Montevideo =

- Barrio
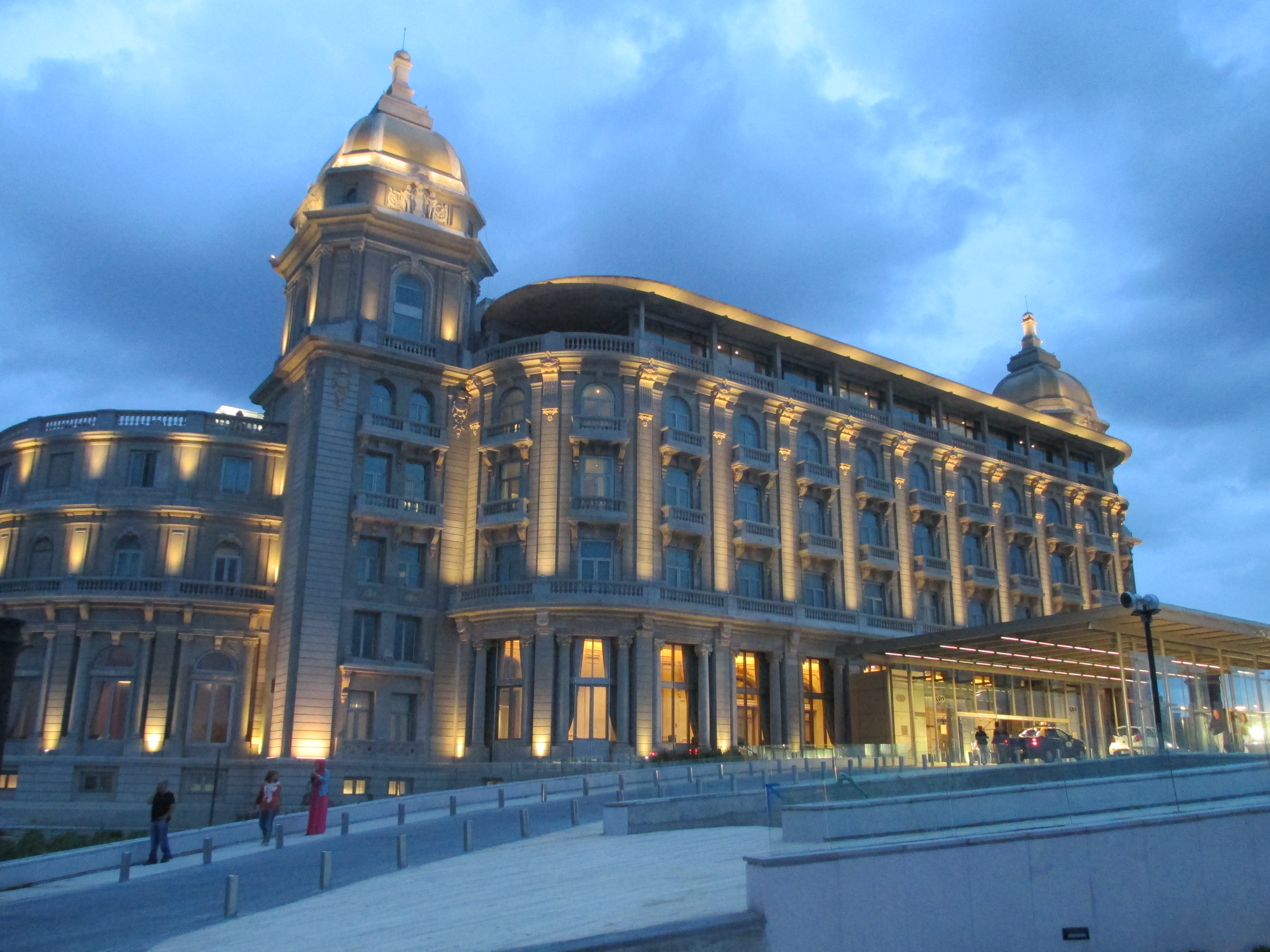
- Casino Carrasco by MaxiCiccone; Hotel Carrasco

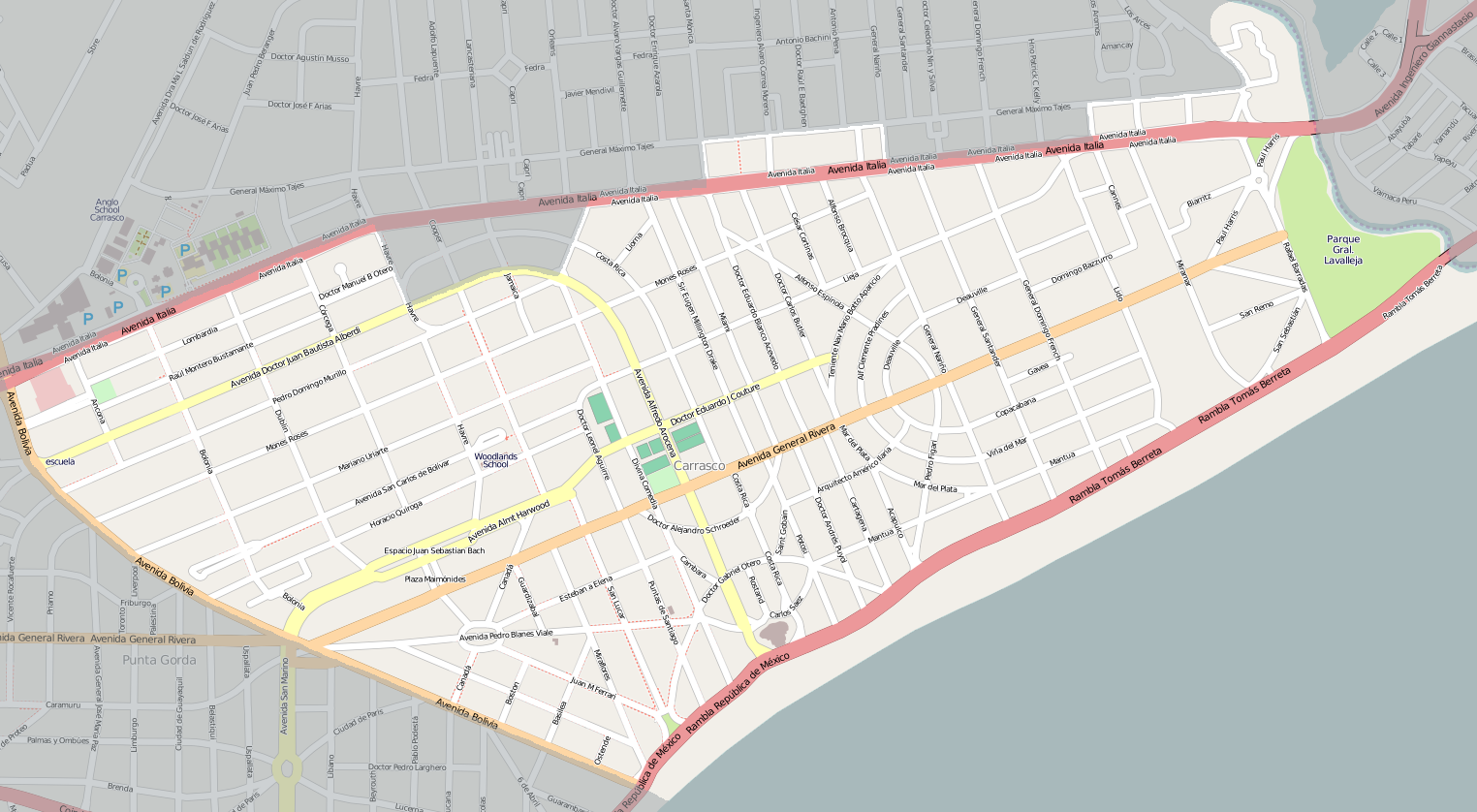
- Street map of Carrasco

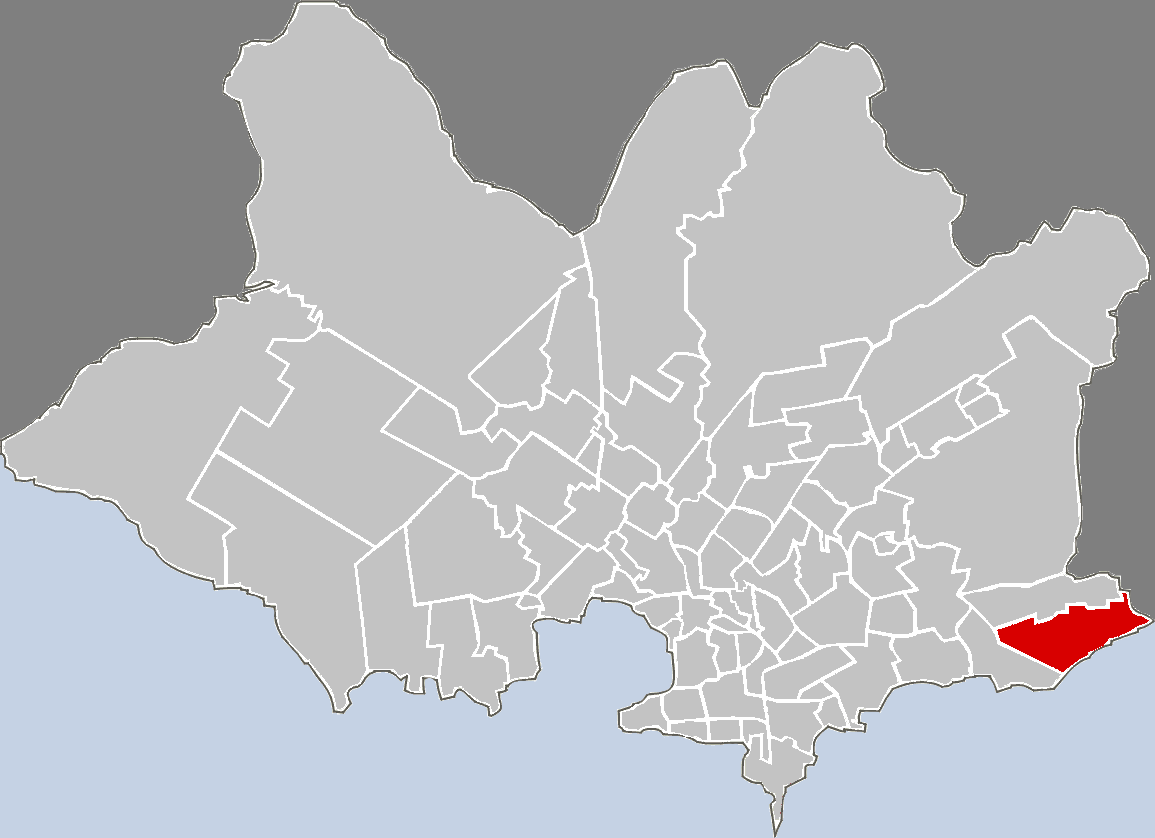
- Location of Carrasco in Montevideo
- Coordinates: 34°53′S 56°04′W
- Country: Uruguay
- Department: Montevideo Department
- City: Montevideo

Population
  - Total: 25,000

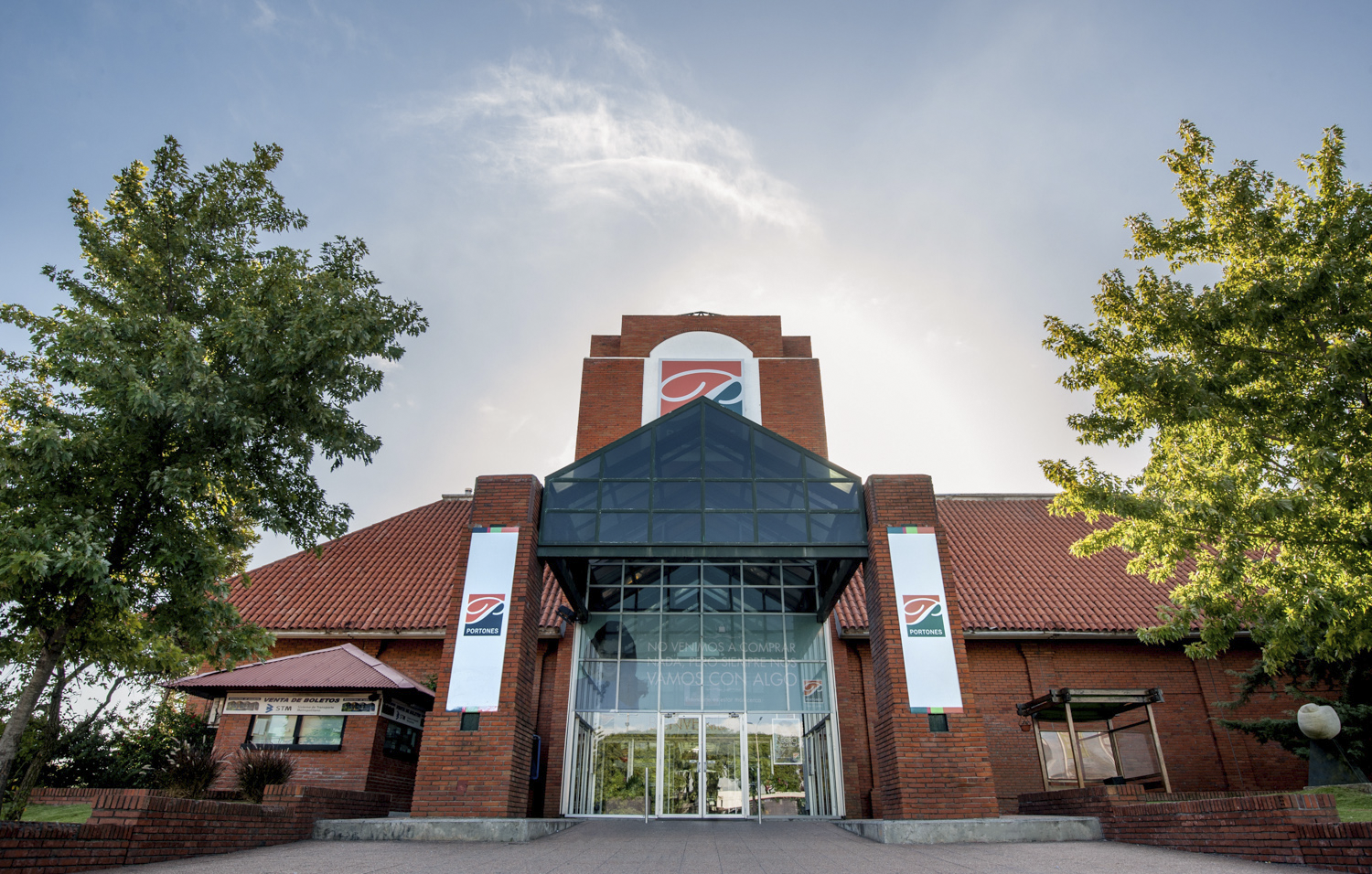
Portones Shopping, shopping mall opened in 1994.

Carrasco is a barrio (neighborhood or district) in Montevideo, Uruguay. Located on the city's southeast coast, the barrio was originally an elegant seaside resort. It eventually became the city's most exclusive suburb and is regarded as one of the city's most expensive neighborhoods. It features a wide range of architectural styles.

== Location ==
Carrasco borders Punta Gorda to the west, Carrasco Norte to the north, Canelones Department to the east and the coastline to the south.

Part of the seafront avenue along Carrasco is named Rambla Tomás Berreta and across it stretches the beach of Carrasco.

Its main street Alfredo Arocena, named after its founder, ends at the beach.

The Carrasco Creek separates this neighbourhood from Canelones Department.

== Education ==
Although there are no universities in the area of Carrasco, this barrio (together with adjacent Carrasco Norte) is home to many independent schools including: Woodlands School, Saint Patrick's College, Preuniversitario Carrasco, Scuola Italiana di Montevideo, The British Schools and the Uruguayan American School, which has 32 nationalities amongst its 300 students.

== Places of worship ==
- Stella Maris Parish Church, Gabriel Otero 6489 (Roman Catholic)
- Parish Church of St. Joseph of the Mountain and St. Teresa of Jesus, Havre 2179 (Roman Catholic, Carmelites)
- Montevideo Temple, Bolonia 1722 (Latter-Day Saints)

== See also ==
- Barrios of Montevideo
- Carrasco Polo Club, which despite its name is best known for rugby
- Estadio Charrúa, a football and rugby union stadium located in the barrio, which also serves as headquarters for the Uruguayan Rugby Union
- Hotel Carrasco
- Montevideo Cricket Club, another multisport club, formerly based in Carrasco.
- Carrasco International Airport
