= Visit by Pope Leo XIV to Uruguay, Argentina, and Peru =

2026 apostolic journey

Apostolic Journey to Uruguay, Argentina and Peru
- Date: 6–17 November 2026
- Location: Uruguay: Montevideo; Paysandú; Florida Argentina: Buenos Aires; Claypole; Luján; Córdoba Peru: Lima; Chiclayo; Cuzco; Pucallpa
- Website: elpapaenargentina.com.ar papaleonuruguay.uy leon14enperu.com

Pope Leo XIV was visiting Uruguay, Argentina, and Peru from 6 to 17 November 2026, marking his seventh apostolic journey outside Italy and his first visit to the Americas since his election in May 2025. The Holy See Press Office announced the itinerary in September.

== Background ==
=== Uruguay ===
Uruguay has one of the most secular societies in Latin America, although Catholicism remains the country's largest religious affiliation, with approximately 33–38% of the population identifying as Catholic. The country has maintained the separation of church and state since 1917. Uruguay has hosted two papal visits, both by Pope John Paul II, in 1987 and 1988.

=== Argentina ===
Argentina was the homeland of Leo XIV's predecessor, Pope Francis, who never returned to the country since leaving for the 2013 conclave until the end of his papacy. The only serving pope to visit the country was John Paul II, in 1982 during the Falklands War, and again in 1987 after the return to democracy. From 1980 to 2020, the number of parishes and bishops increased, though the number of people taking sacraments such as religious marriage decreased. Data from the University of Buenos Aires showed that Catholicism in Argentina declined from 90% in 1960 to 57.7% in 2026, while irreligion grew to 22.4% and Evangelical Christianity to 17.4%.

=== Peru ===
At the start of 2025, the Catholic Church in Peru was affected by the dissolution of the society Sodalitium Christianae Vitae by Pope Francis after accusations of misconduct, and the denouncing of the cardinal Juan Luis Cipriani for alleged child sex offences. The Catholic population of the country declined from 90.5% in 1995 to 64% in 2024, with 2.4% leaving in 2023 alone. The remaining percentage was still the fifth highest in Latin America.

Peru was visited by John Paul II in 1985 and 1988, and Pope Francis in 2018. Leo XIV, who was born in the United States, arrived in Peru in 1985. In 2015, he became a Peruvian citizen and assumed the position of Bishop of Chiclayo.

=== Health of the Pope ===
On 13 October 2026, Leo XIV had a lung nodule removed, which was confirmed as adenocarcinoma of the lung, a form of lung cancer. The Associated Press wrote the following day that it was uncertain whether the visit would follow its full itinerary, or if it would happen at all. On 21 October, the Holy See Press Office announced that Leo XIV's physicians declared that "no further treatment was necessary" after his operation, effectively rendering him cancer-free. On 23 October, as part of the Pope's recovery process, the Vatican announced the cancellation of the Pope's travel to Assisi on 27 October, sparking some rumors whether the trip will continue or not.

However, on 26 October, the Holy See Press Office released a communication announcing that Leo is medically cleared to undergo the trip to Latin America, and the itinerary will proceed as scheduled. The Pope himself said in a statement, "I am looking forward to returning to the continent where I’ve experienced so many moments of my life." During the in-flight press conference in his flight to Uruguay, Leo said he was confident that the journey will take place as planned, saying that he is in good shape, while thanking his medical staff.

== Itinerary ==
=== Uruguay ===
Honor guard for Leo XIV at Carrasco International Airport.

Pope Leo XIV arrived in Montevideo on 6 November at 4:25 p.m. (UTC−03:00), where he was welcomed at Carrasco International Airport by President Yamandú Orsi, Foreign Minister Mario Lubetkin, Archbishop of Montevideo Daniel Sturla, and military authorities. Upon his arrival, the bells of Catholic churches across the country rang for five minutes as a sign of welcome. He then travelled by car along the city's Rambla, the coastal avenue, before switching to the popemobile near Rambla Presidente Wilson in the Parque Rodó neighbourhood.

Following the drive, an official welcome ceremony was held at Plaza Independencia in central Montevideo. The pope was received by President Orsi, Vice President Carolina Cosse, Supreme Court President Doris Morales Martínez, and Uruguay's three living former presidents: Julio María Sanguinetti, Luis Alberto Lacalle, and Luis Lacalle Pou. The event was attended by political representatives, members of civil society, and members of the diplomatic corps accredited to Uruguay, as well as a large crowd of faithful who gathered in the square to hear the pope. In his address, Leo XIV made indirect references critical of abortion and euthanasia, both of which are legal in Uruguay. He also quoted Uruguayan national hero José Gervasio Artigas on the exercise of authority and public service, drawing on the inscriptions on the bronze frieze of his monument in the square. The ceremony included performances by the orchestra and choirs of SODRE.

Leo XIV and Orsi at Estévez Palace

After the ceremony, the pope held a private meeting with President Orsi at Estévez Palace, the seat of government, where he received locally crafted gifts. He then walked through the Gateway of the Citadel into Ciudad Vieja, proceeding along Peatonal Sarandí towards Constitution Square while greeting the faithful from a small popemobile adapted from a golf cart for the occasion. The vehicle was designed to accommodate the pope's health needs. The first day of the visit concluded with the presentation of the keys to the city by Intendant Mario Bergara at the Cabildo, followed by a meeting with religious representatives at the Metropolitan Cathedral. The pope wore liturgical vestments that included a green cope inspired by Uruguay's religious heritage.

Pope Leo XIV's prayer vigil in the Estadio Centenario on 7 November 2026

On 7 November, the pope travelled to the city of Paysandú, where he celebrated his first Mass in the Americas as pope at Parque París Londres before a crowd of around 40,000 people. During the Mass, he referred to the city's siege in 1864, elements of Uruguayan culture such as mate, and Blessed Jacinto Vera. He later visited the Basilica of Our Lady of the Rosary and Saint Benedict of Palermo, where he prayed at the altar, unveiled a commemorative plaque, and blessed a group of people with disabilities.

He returned to Montevideo around midday, where he visited Our Lady of Guadalupe Parish and Catholic Church projects in the disadvantaged neighbourhood of Casavalle. In the afternoon, he visited the Catholic University of Uruguay, where a meeting with university authorities and representatives of the education sector was held in the institution's Aula Magna. In his address, the pope called for the responsible use of artificial intelligence and emphasized the need to put people before algorithms. The meeting also included a brief exchange with representatives of non-Catholic Christian denominations and the Uruguayan Jewish community. Before leaving, he greeted students gathered in the building's central courtyard from a balcony and unveiled a commemorative plaque next to the one unveiled by John Paul II in 1988.

The second day concluded with a prayer vigil at Estadio Centenario, with an attendance of around 60,000 inside the stadium and others outside.

On 8 November, the Pope travelled to Florida, where he celebrated Mass at Plaza Asamblea, in front of the Cathedral Basilica and the National Shrine of Our Lady of the Thirty-Three, the patron saint of Uruguay. He gave the Virgin a Golden Rose, a papal tradition. In the afternoon, a farewell ceremony was held at Carrasco International Airport, from where the Pope departed for Argentina.

=== Argentina ===
Pope Leo XIV and Javier Milei at the Casa Rosada on 8 November 2026

Pope Leo XIV in the Popemobile on 9 November 2026 in Palermo, Buenos Aires

Pope Leo XIV arrived in Argentina at Aeroparque Jorge Newbery at 4:30 pm on 8 November, and visited the General José de San Martín Monument. At the Casa Rosada, he will meet the President of Argentina, Javier Milei. He then visited the Libertad Palace, where he criticized Milei's policies, stating that Argentina's economy needs to serve everyone including the poor and that an economy should serve the people instead of the other way around.

On 9 November, Leo XIV first visited the Pequeño Cottolengo Argentino Don Orione in Claypole, and then held mass at the Monument to the Carta Magna and Four Regions of Argentina in Palermo, which was attended by an estimated 2.5 million people. In the afternoon, he met trade unionists and representatives of social movements at the Pontifical Catholic University of Argentina, and leaders of other Christian denominations and religions at the San Martín Palace. At the Buenos Aires Metropolitan Cathedral, he held Vespers with the Argentine bishops, and later had dinner with them at the bishop's residence.

Leo XIV flew to Córdoba in the morning of 10 November. He held Mass at the airfield of the Fábrica Argentina de Aviones, next to the Military Aviation School and meet bishops and other clergy at the Cathedral. In his mass before a crowd of 650,000, he connected the church's missionary efforts to the local saints of Córdoba, Cura Brochero and Mama Antula and citing the words of his predecessor dreamt of "a church that keeps making a mess". After returning to the capital city in the afternoon, he led a vigil with some 1 million young people at the monument in Palermo.

Pope Leo XIV before his mass on 10 November 2026 in Córdoba, Argentina

On 11 November, Leo XIV visited the Federal Correctional Complex and celebrated mass at the Basilica of Our Lady of Luján, which was attended by an estimated 3.5 million people according to local authorities. In the after noon, he departed from Ezeiza International Airport to Lima, Peru.

=== Peru ===
Pope Leo XIV arrived at the Callao Air Base, near Lima, on Wednesday, 11 November 2026, where he was received by President Keiko Fujimori. According to the Vatican, an estimated 3 million people lined the streets of the capital as his motorcade travelled to the Palacio de Gobierno. After a welcome ceremony and a meeting with the President, he addressed the authorities, civil society and the diplomatic corps at the Gran Teatro Nacional, where he recalled his decades in the country and the Peruvian citizenship he received in 2015, saying that he was "also returning to my homeland".

On 12 November, Leo met with the Peruvian bishops at the Archbishop's Residence in Lima, where he referred to clerical abuse as "a reality that has caused us so much pain" and called for a culture of prevention and protection. He then led mid-morning prayer at the Metropolitan Cathedral of Lima and addressed some 40,000 people gathered in the square outside the cathedral at a meeting on the challenges and hopes for the country's future. In the afternoon he met for over an hour at the Apostolic Nunciature with six survivors of abuse by members of the clergy and Church institutions in Peru, some of them former members of groups linked to the Sodalitium Christianae Vitae. In the evening he led a prayer vigil with about 60,000 young people and university students at the National Stadium of Peru.

On Friday, 13 November 2026, Leo flew from Lima to Chiclayo, the diocese he had led as bishop from 2015 to 2023. He celebrated Mass at the Pampas de Pimentel, which the Vatican said was attended by about 500,000 people; according to Vatican estimates, a total of 1.5 million people gathered along the streets and at the Mass to welcome him. He then paid a private visit to the "San Oscar A. Romero" Chapel. In the afternoon he met with bishops, priests, consecrated men and women, seminarians, synodal teams and pastoral councils at the Shrine of Our Lady of Peace, and then with the community of Santo Toribio de Mogrovejo Catholic University.

In the morning of Saturday, 14 November 2026, Leo presided over the Rite of Coronation of the Immaculate Virgin at St. Mary's Cathedral, Chiclayo. He celebrated Mass in Santa Cruz de Succhubamba at 11:00 am, before returning to Chiclayo, where he presided over a prayer meeting with the Catholic Community on the occasion of the closing of the Jubilee Year of Santo Toribio de Mogrovejo in the afternoon.

On Sunday, 15 November 2026, Leo left Chiclayo for Cusco, where he met with the faithful and representatives of popular devotion at the "Saqsaywaman" National Archeological Park, and led the Angelus at the square in front of the Cusco Cathedral. He also traveled to Pucallpa to meet with missionaries and representatives of the Amazonian people, and celebrate Mass at the Villa Deportiva Regional Ucayali, before returning to Lima.

The Pope's trip to Peru concluded on 16 November 2026, and consisted of a visit to the staff and residents of a shelter run by the Little Sisters for Abandoned Elderly People, celebration of Mass at the Las Palmas Air Base, and a farewell ceremony at the Callao Air Base before returning to Rome on Tuesday, 17 November 2026.

== Preparations ==
=== Uruguay ===
Preparations for the apostolic visit were coordinated by the Episcopal Conference of Uruguay, which established an organizational structure headed by its president, Bishop Milton Tróccoli, as general coordinator, and priest Sebastián Pinazzo, as deputy coordinator. Several committees were formed to oversee different aspects of the preparations, including communications, administration and finance, and pastoral affairs and liturgy.

On 3 September, a Vatican delegation led by priest José Salas Castañeda arrived in Uruguay to inspect the planned venues, determine the itinerary, and review logistical arrangements. The Catholic Church in Uruguay was estimated to allocate between US$2.5 million and US$3 million to organizing the visit. To help fund the preparations, organizers announced a raffle with tickets priced at $U 2,000 (approximately US$50) and 14 prizes, including an apartment, ten cars, and three all-expenses-paid trips to Rome. In late September, a call for volunteers was launched to assist with the organization and logistics of the events, attracting 1,000 registrations in its first week.

On 27 September, the Uruguayan Air Force's helicopter unit conducted drills in Montevideo's La Blanqueada neighborhood, bringing a helipad near the Central Hospital of the Armed Forces and Estadio Centenario back into use. The exercise was part of preparations for a potential large-scale emergency.

On 2 October, the official song for the visit was released, featuring several singers, including Lucas Sugo. The song blends elements of Uruguayan folk music, with lyrics referencing the country's national identity. Its title, Una gran alegría (Spanish for 'A great joy'), is also the visit's slogan and refers to the angel's announcement of Jesus' birth to the shepherds of Bethlehem in the Gospel of Luke.
