= Italian Hospital of Montevideo =

Coordinates: 34°53′46″S 56°9′51″W

Italian Hospital of MontevideoThe Italian Hospital of Montevideo
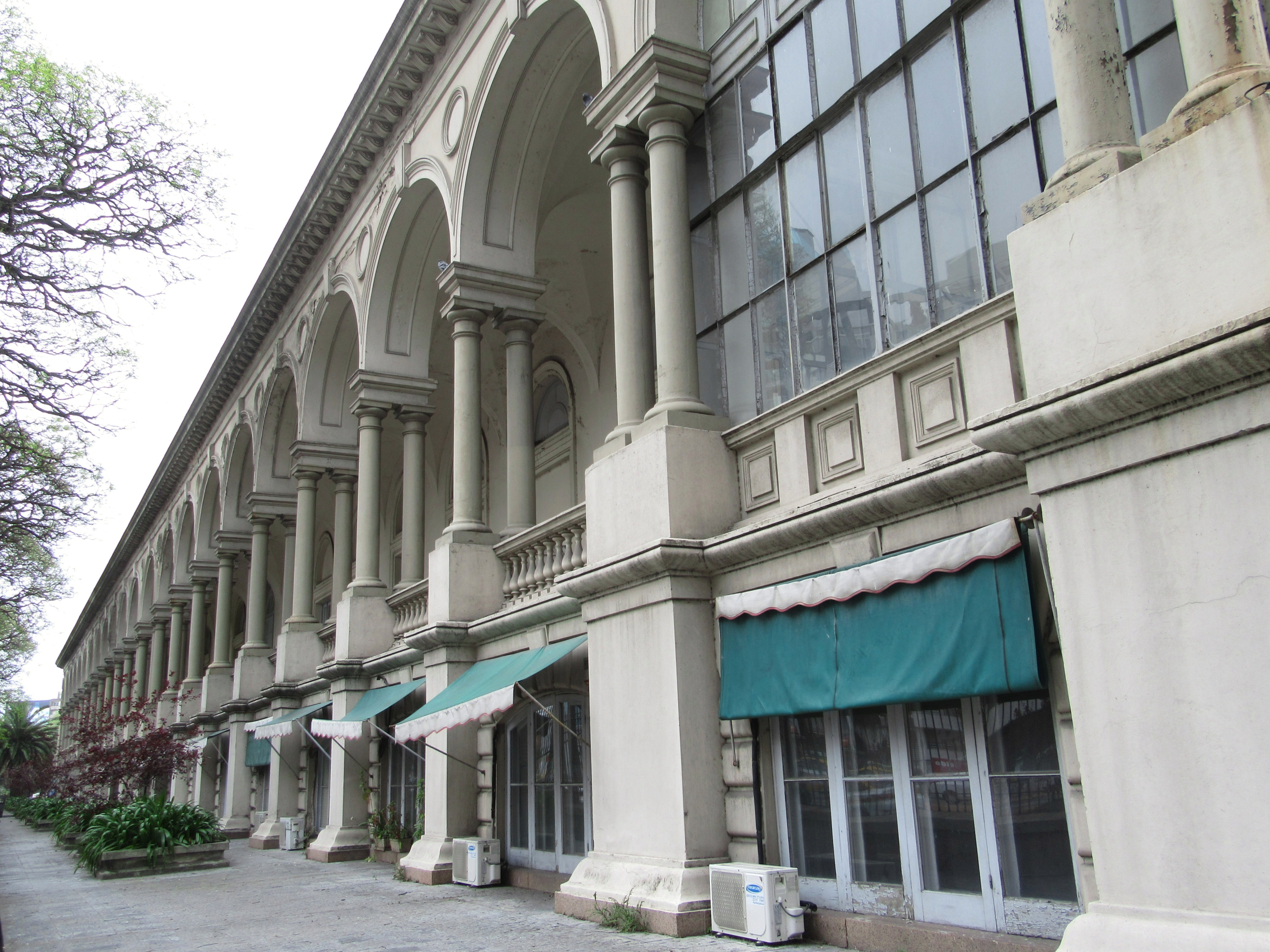
- The Italian Hospital of Montevideo

Geography
- Location: Bulevar Artigas 1632, Parque Batlle, Montevideo, Uruguay

Organisation
- Care system: Private, mutualism
- Type: General

Services
- Beds: 250

History
- Founded: 1890

The Italian Hospital of Montevideo, whose official name is Ospedale italiano Umberto I, (Spanish: Hospital Italiano de Montevideo) is a clinic and sanatorium founded in 1890 near Parque Batlle, Montevideo. It lies just to the north of the 1830 obelisk and the Hospital Pereira Rossell. The building, of the late neoclassical style, is the work of architect Luis Andreoni.

The structure, as well as the pillars supporting the basis on which the original model, are the result of a process of construction tardío en a city that, in essence, had just started to expand in the last part of the 18th century, with the arrival of immigrants from Europe after the end of the internal wars and the independence war of the new country.

The hospital functions, since then, almost continually for more than 110 years. Its deterioration in time has brought the need for restoration to many of its facilities, including the side and rear facades, which was done with funding supplied jointly by the Uruguayan and Italian governments in 2003.

== History ==
After the war of independence, Uruguay retained gaps in its political, economic and social development. Not until the mid-nineteenth century, did Uruguay manage to put an end to a series of irregularities that were not helpful in solving the internal party crisis.

The foundation of the hospital in a non-fortified area, commissioned by the Italian Embassy in Montevideo, was executed after nearly a decade of work. The initial objective of the institution created under the supervision and direction of the italo-Uruguayan architect Luis Andreoni, was to provide basic health services, to confront the high percentage of infant mortality, product of the scarcity of resources and of public access to hospitals. The opening ceremony, in 1890, attracted a large number of Uruguayan citizens and foreigners. Around the perimeter of Parque Batlle, were raised more than fifty flags of the former Kingdom of Italy.

=== Italian Immigration ===
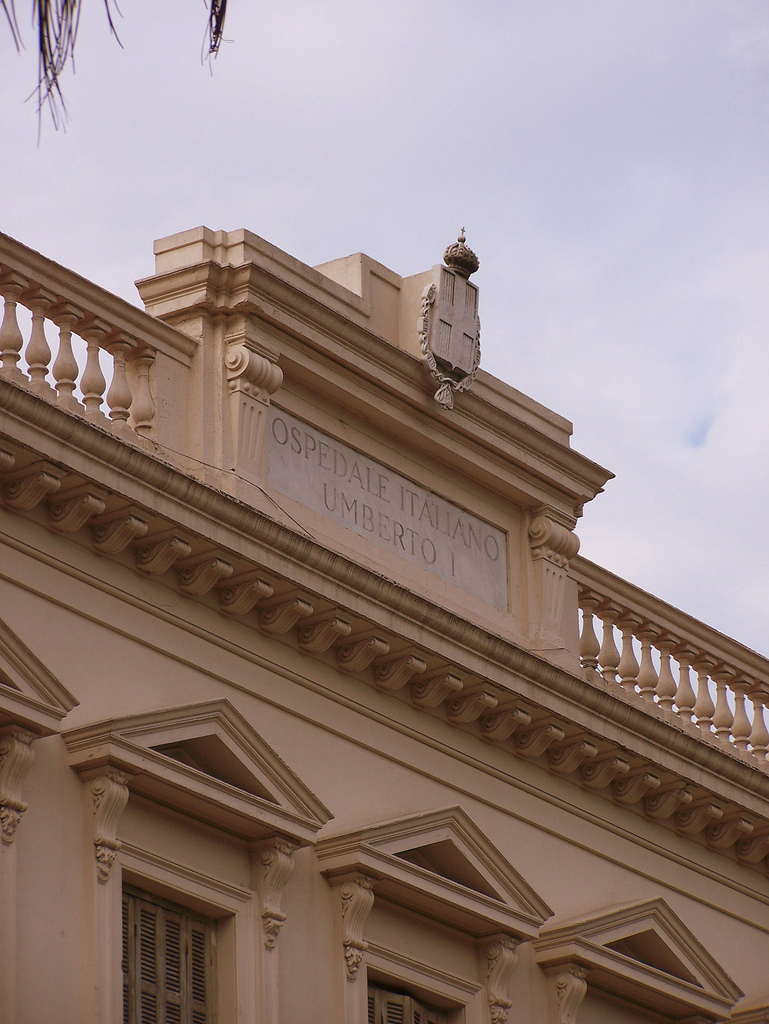
Entrada principal, donde se puede leer el nombre original: Ospedale italiano Umberto I.

The first Italian immigrants that arrived in the eastern province, did so in the times of colonial Spain. The majority of them originated from Genoa, Naples, Venecia and Sicily.

Later on, in the beginning of the 19th century, taking part in the battles for independence and headed by the Italian military leader Giuseppe Garibaldi, many of his compatriots were attracted by the ideas embodied by the leader of Gallic origin. The political movement in which subscribed equally rioplatenses, criollos and Italians is now known as "corriente garibaldina". From the work and management of Garibaldi, several tributes emerged to his figure, among which one avenue in Montevideo which bears his name, a monument in his memory in the city of Salto and an Italian hospital in Buenos Aires.

Around the end of the 19th century and the beginning of the 20th, arrived a third wave of immigrants from Italy. This is known commonly as the "migración transformadora", because during this period, Uruguay experienced significant changes in style and quality of life of its population. The Italians that arrived at this stage, as well as in the fourth and final stage, the post-world war, made great contributions in the architecture and the national cuisine. In this cultural background follows the foundation of the Italian hospital, which dates during the last decade of the 19th century, and that has for name that of the second monarch of the Italian peninsula, king Umberto I.

In the interior of the country, although the Italian influence was more isolated, various organizations were founded with the aim of spreading and maintaining the cultural element of that European country. In Paysandú took place a most pronounced change, as it is currently estimated that 60% of its population is of Italian origin or descent. Among the most prominent societies they formed are included the Unione e Benevolenza, the Scuola Italiana and the more recent Federazione Italiana de Paysandú.

== Architecture ==
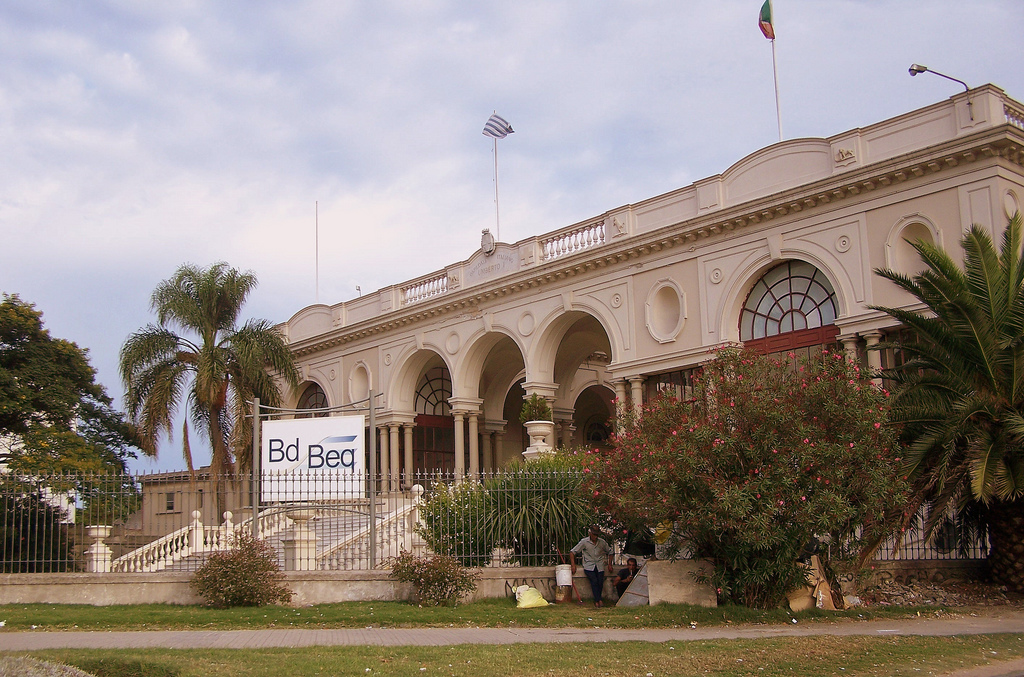
Facade of the hospital viewed from Avenida Italia.

The hospital is built in the neoclassical architectural style, which has its origins in Italy. From this architectural phase come other famous monuments, like the Puerta de Alcalá in Madrid, work of Francesco Sabatini.

The architect responsible for directing and planning this structure of historicist influence was Luis Andreoni, also responsible for the foundation of the Estación Central General Artigas and the Club Uruguay. He is based on a procedure as much artistic as scientific in accuracy, characteristic of an era in with scarce economic resources. In this sense, the Italian hospital is one of the first representatives of progressive art in Uruguay, of a simplistic and objective trait, that was the opposite of the subjectivity and decorum that had characterized the earlier stages, which were seeing slight revival in the building of the Palacio Legislativo of Montevideo, also by Italian architects, in 1925.

The Roman style columns, constructed on top of a firm base and in exact geometric placement, in two of the four sides of construction, enhance the concept of unity between art and science, typical of late neoclassicism. In an effort to revive a classic model, materials such as marble, granite and azulejo are used, imported from Europe, to recreate an image that combines the nuances of ancient art with the advances of modern science. Finally, the wing on the side of Artigas Boulevard, known as the "Passiva of the Hospital Italiano", is a bracket of bronze sculptures and figures that commemorate great personalities of both Italy and Uruguay. The bust in honor of national hero José Gervasio Artigas also stands next to the hospital.

The hospital covers an approximate overall area of 30,000 square metres (320,000 sq ft), and its age, of more than 110 years, place it among the oldest active hospitals of Montevideo and the country. It is located at the intersection of Italia Avenue Artigas Boulevard, with entrances on Jorge Canning Street. The installation is divided into two zones for specific purposes: hospital and sanatorium. The maternity section is on the first floor, while the general out-patient clinic and the surgery takes place on the second floor.

== Medical Services ==
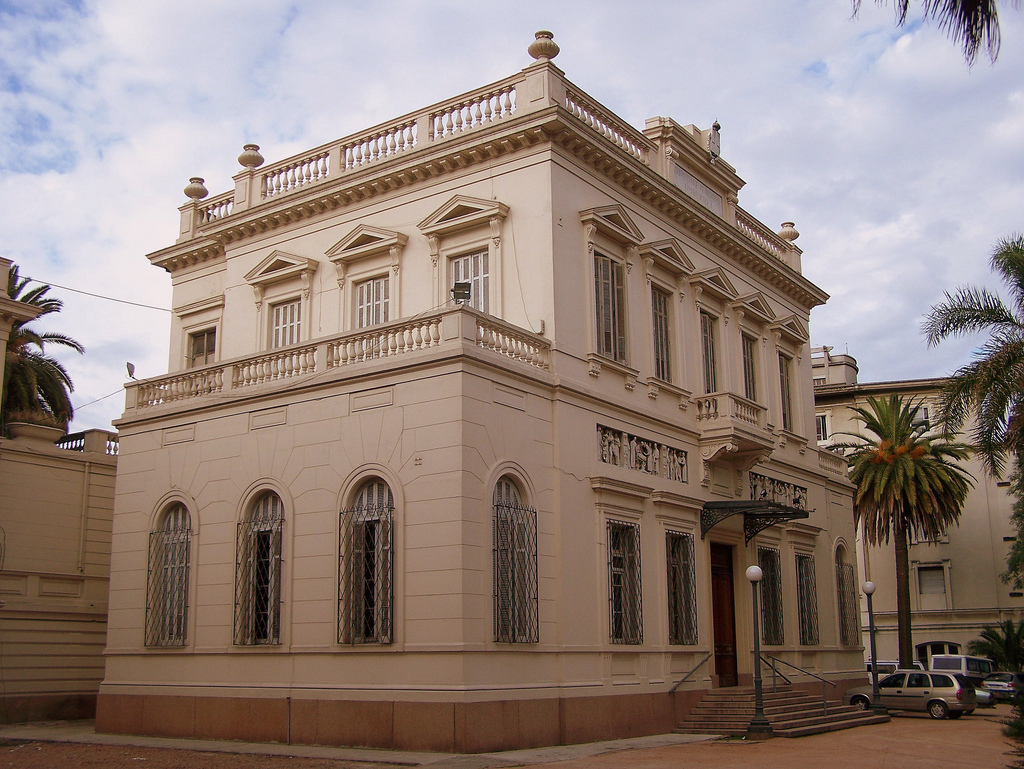
El hospital tras las obras de restauración.

The Italian hospital has always occupied a leading role in the field of Uruguayan medicine. The medical service is private but directly depends on the Ministry of Public Health (MSP) and as such, also offers low cost treatment for the second level and the terminally ill. Medical consultations are often conducted by appointment of the mutual "Universal de Montevideo".

Currently the maternity is open (continuously since its founding) and there have been added new specialties in the field of surgery, and technological advances. Operations and kidney transplantation are some of the techniques implemented more recently.

Despite the physical deterioration of the facility and the sequestration (because of debts) that happened in early 2004, joint efforts by representatives of the government Italian in Uruguay, and of the Uruguayan Medical Union (Sindicato Médico Uruguayo) (SMU) have been able to counter the debt and the deterioration of the hospital, bringing donations for the renovation and improvement of its interior and exterior. The work was approved by the directors of the hospital, Jorge Renato Massa and Azzoni.
