= Peatonal Sarandí =

Street in Montevideo, Uruguay

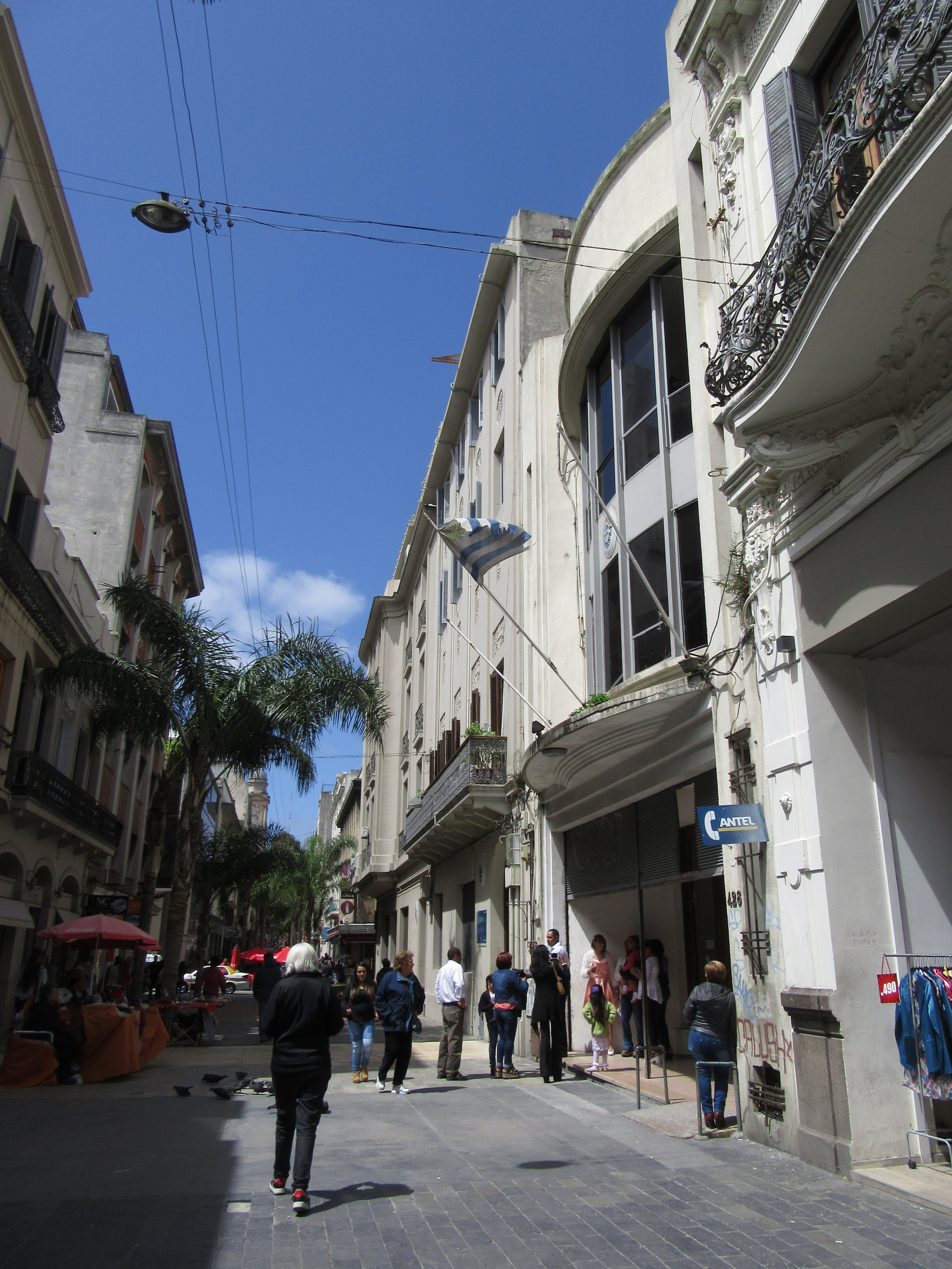
Peatonal Sarandí in Ciudad Vieja

Peatonal Sarandí is an 0.5 miles (850 m) pedestrian street in Ciudad Vieja, Montevideo, Uruguay. It is the main lane of the historic center, and one of the most touristic sites in the city, due to the fact that it is flanked by different architecturally notable buildings. The pedestrian street starts at the Gateway of the Citadel and ends at its intersection with Peatonal Pérez Castellano, while the remaining four blocks, up to the Rambla, are allowed for vehicles. As an extension of this street is the long southern breakwater of the Port of Montevideo, which has taken on the name "Escollera Sarandí".

Named after the Battle of Sarandí of 1825, it was pedestrianized in 1992, and reformed in 2005. Trams operated on the road until the mid-20th century.

== History ==
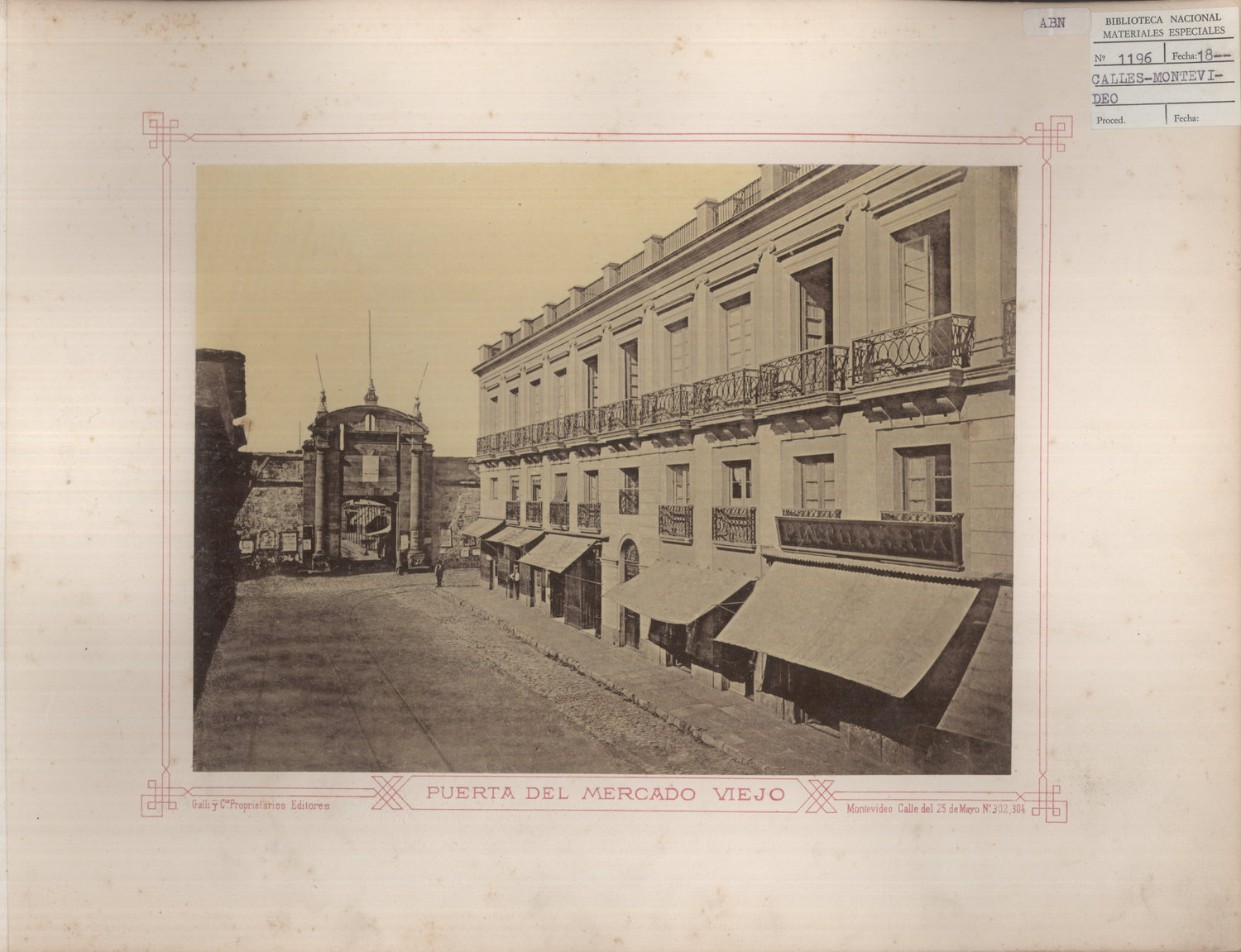
Sarandí St. in 1875

During the colonial period, Sarandí street was the main axis of the city, since it connected the main gateway with the rest of the area, and crossed the plaza mayor —current Constitucion Square—, and was flanked by the main buildings such as the Cathedral and the Cabildo, seat of the government.

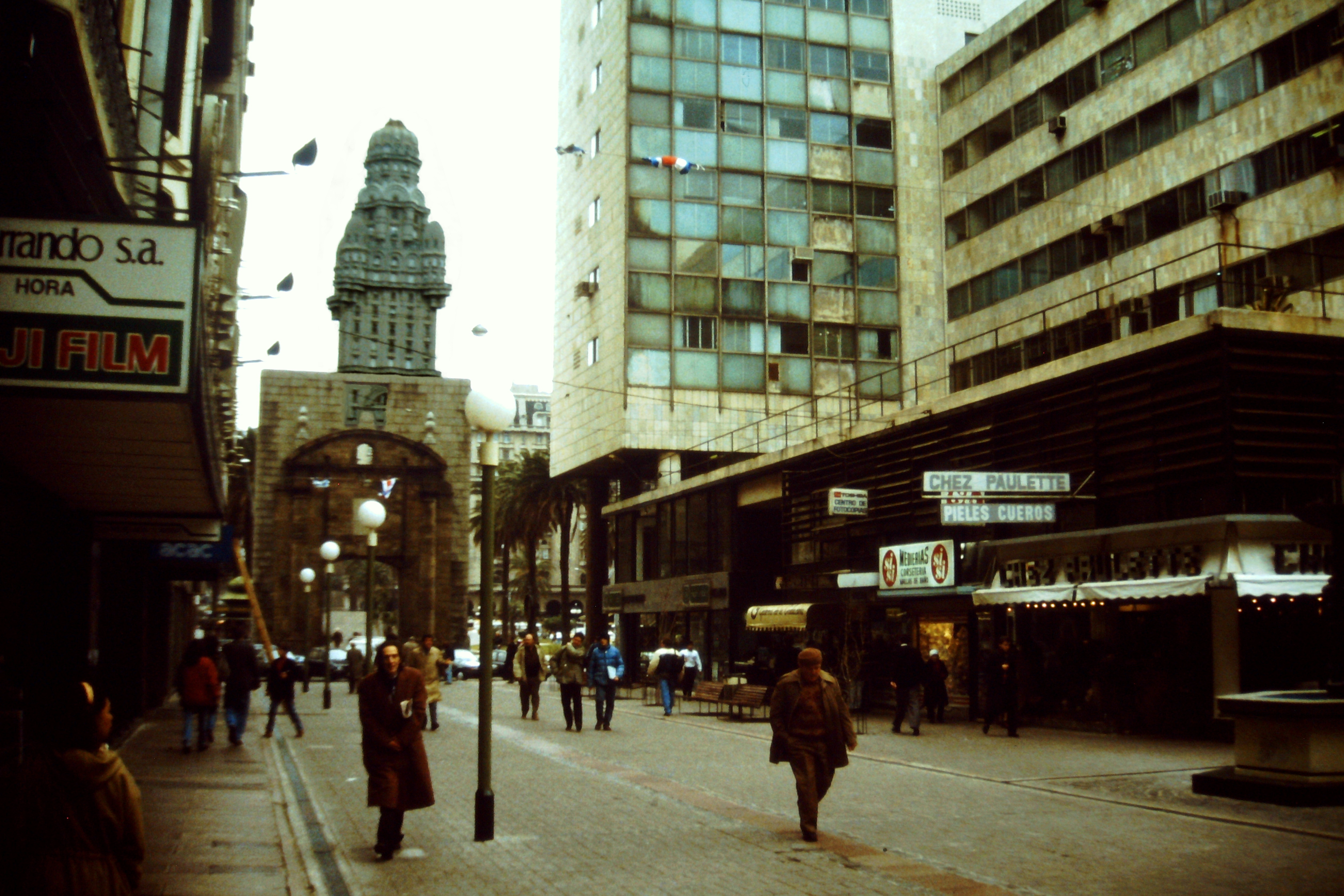
Sarandí St. in the 20th century

On August 25, 1897, President Juan Idiarte Borda was assassinated while leading a procession down Sarandí Street, from the cathedral where he had attended a celebration on the occasion of the independence anniversary to Estévez Palace. It was the only assassination in the country's history.

In April 2010, the Espacio de los Soles (Commonly known as Paseo de los Soles) was inaugurated, consisting of 60cm-sided tiles, with a bordered sun with 16 rays with a face (similar to the one on the Uruguayan flag), bearing the names of references of Uruguayan culture and famous visitors to the city.

== Landmarks ==
Many buildings of architectural value are to be seen along Peatonal Sarandí, as well as art galleries and many stores and businesses. Some of its landmarks are the Edificio Pablo Ferrando, which is next to the Museo Torres García, the Plaza Fuerte Hotel, the Club Uruguay on Constitution Square, the Cabildo, which houses the municipal archive of the city and is also a national monument and museum, and the Montevideo Metropolitan Cathedral, commonly known as Iglesia Matriz, which also gives to the square the popular naming Plaza Matriz.
