= Plaza Zabala =

Urban square in Montevideo, Uruguay

Coordinates: 34°54′28″S 56°12′29″W

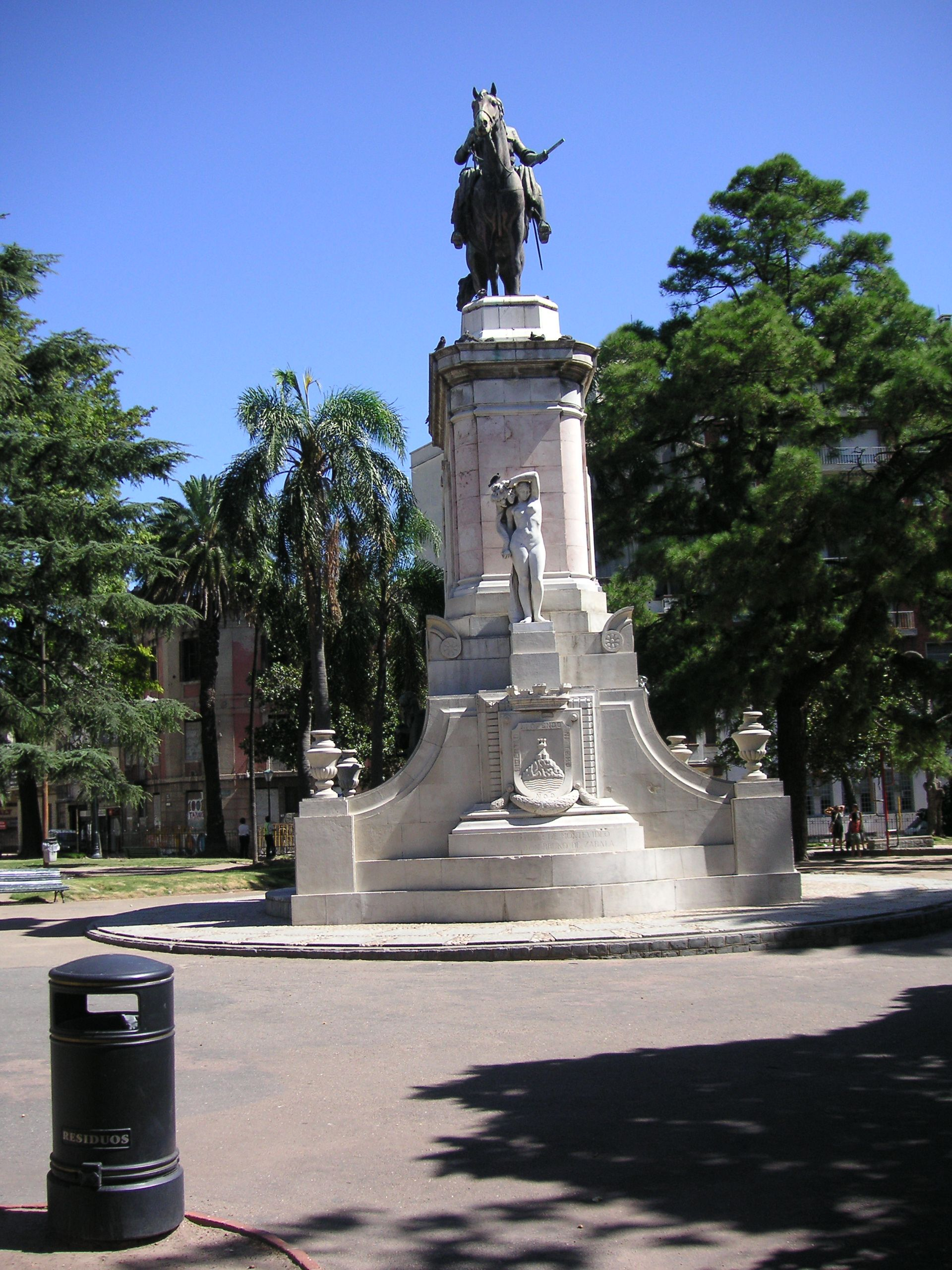
Monument in the centre of the Plaza Zabala.

Plaza Zabala is a plaza in the Ciudad Vieja of Montevideo, Uruguay. In late 1878, during the dictatorship of Colonel Lorenzo Latorre, it was decided to demolish the old fort and build a public square in its place. But for 12 years this site remained a wasteland. The Plaza finally came to be established only on December 31, 1890 when the equestrian statue of Bruno Mauricio de Zabala was installed. It was sculpted by the Spanish sculptor Lorenzo Coullaut Valera in collaboration with the Basque architect Pedro Muguruza Otaño and inaugurated on December 27, 1931.

The Plaza also now takes its name from Bruno Mauricio de Zabala, founder of the city. The monument has an oblique plan. This layout is distinctly different in an area which has streets laid in a checkerboard pattern in the historic district, marked by the gardens designed by the landscape architect French Eduardo André. It is also one of the places where fences and gates of iron are still seen in the city. The street surrounding the square is named as Ring Durango, in honor of the town Vizcaya of Durango, where Zabala was born. On its south side, Palacio Taranco, once residence of the Ortiz Taranco brothers, is now the Museum of Decorative Arts, and on its west, the well-preserved ex-residence of Sáenz de Zumarán is now the seat of the Discount Bank.
