= Luis Andreoni =

Engineer and architect from Italy known for work in Uruguay (1853–1936)

Luigi Andreoni or Luis Andreoni (Vercelli, Italy, October 7, 1853 – Montevideo, May 20, 1936) was an Italian engineer and architect of outstanding performance in Uruguay.

== Biography ==
Educated in Turin, he graduated in 1875 and arrived in Montevideo in 1876. He was a distinguished representative of historical eclecticism in Montevideo. Looking to Europe as a model, Andreoni enriched the city with the seal of the belle époque. Of note are Ospedale Italiano Umberto I (1884-1890), Club Uruguay (1888), Buxareo Palace (about 1890) (current French Embassy), Theatre Stella d'Italia (1895) (now Teatro La Gaviota) and General Artigas Central Railway Station, opened in 1897.

He also had a collection of classical archeology, currently preserved in the Palace Taranco.

== Literature ==
- Lucchini, Aurelio (1969). Ideas y formas en la arquitectura nacional. Colección Nuestra Tierra (in Spanish). Vol. 6. Montevideo.
- Lucchini, Aurelio (1986). El Concepto de Arquitectura y su traducción a formas en el territorio que hoy pertenece a Uruguay (in Spanish). Montevideo: Universidad de la República.
