= Mercado del Puerto =

Port Market
- Mercado del Puerto (Spanish)
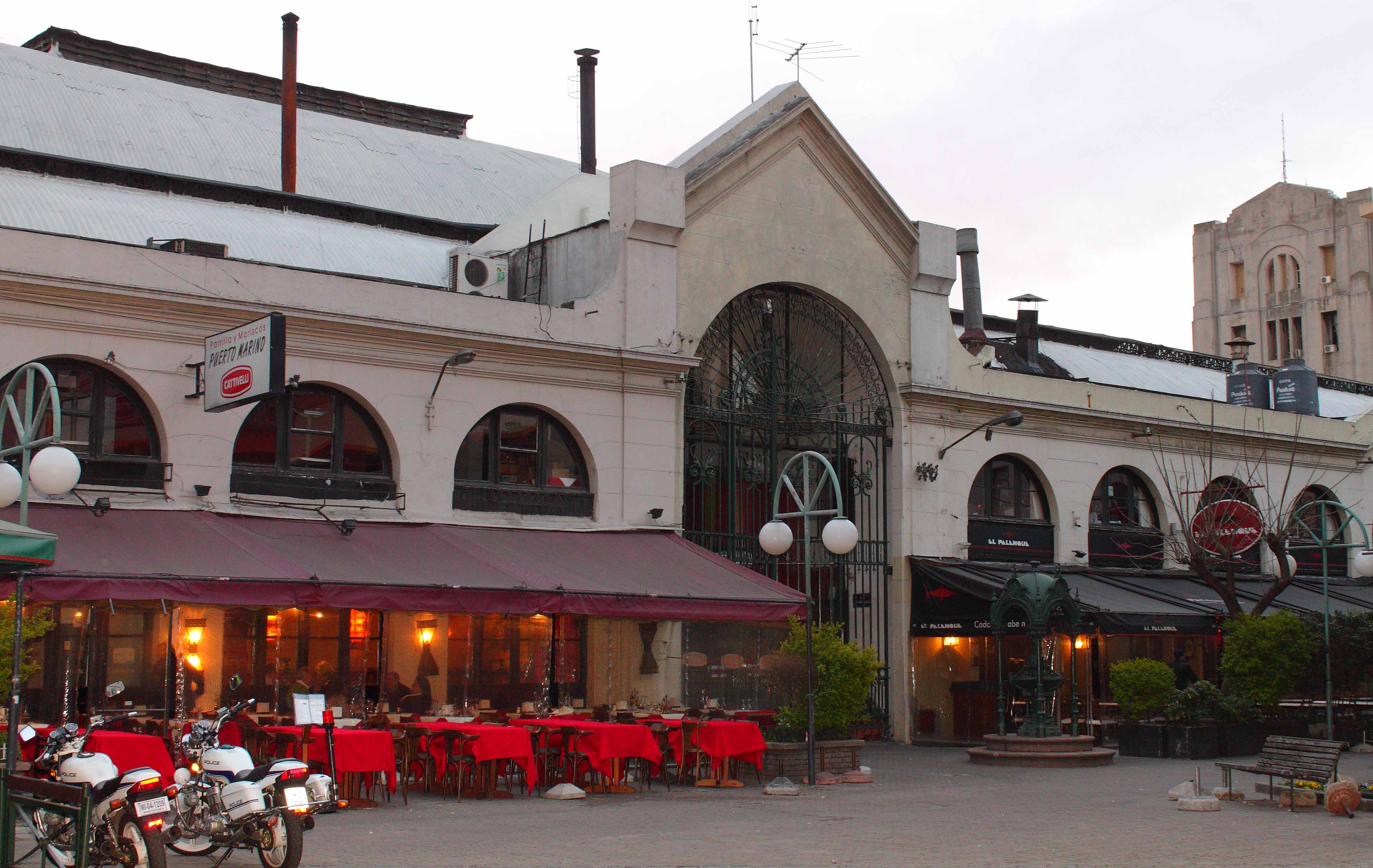

- Location within Uruguay
- 34.9057°S 56.2117°W
- Location: Montevideo, Uruguay

History
- Founded: 10 October 1868 (157 years ago)

Site notes
- Architectural style: Eclecticism

The Mercado del Puerto (English: Port Market) is a gastronomic and cultural venue in the Ciudad Vieja neighborhood of Montevideo, Uruguay. Originally built as a covered marketplace, it no longer functions as one and now houses restaurants serving traditional Uruguayan cuisine, with a focus on asado cooked over open-fire parrillas.

Named for its proximity to the city's port, Mercado del Puerto is an important tourist site located in Montevideo's historic district. The area also features live tango performances and displays of Uruguayan cultural traditions. It is the site of an annual New Year's Eve midday celebration, where a large-scale street festival takes place featuring a traditional water and cider fight, drawing widespread participation from both local residents and international visitors.

== History ==
Mercado del Puerto in 1907

The Mercado del Puerto was established through the initiative of Spanish merchant Pedro Sáenz de Zumarán, who led a private company aiming to build one of the largest markets in South America. The structure was designed by British engineers, with its iron components manufactured in Liverpool. It was inaugurated on October 10, 1868, in the presence of President Lorenzo Batlle y Grau and his ministers.

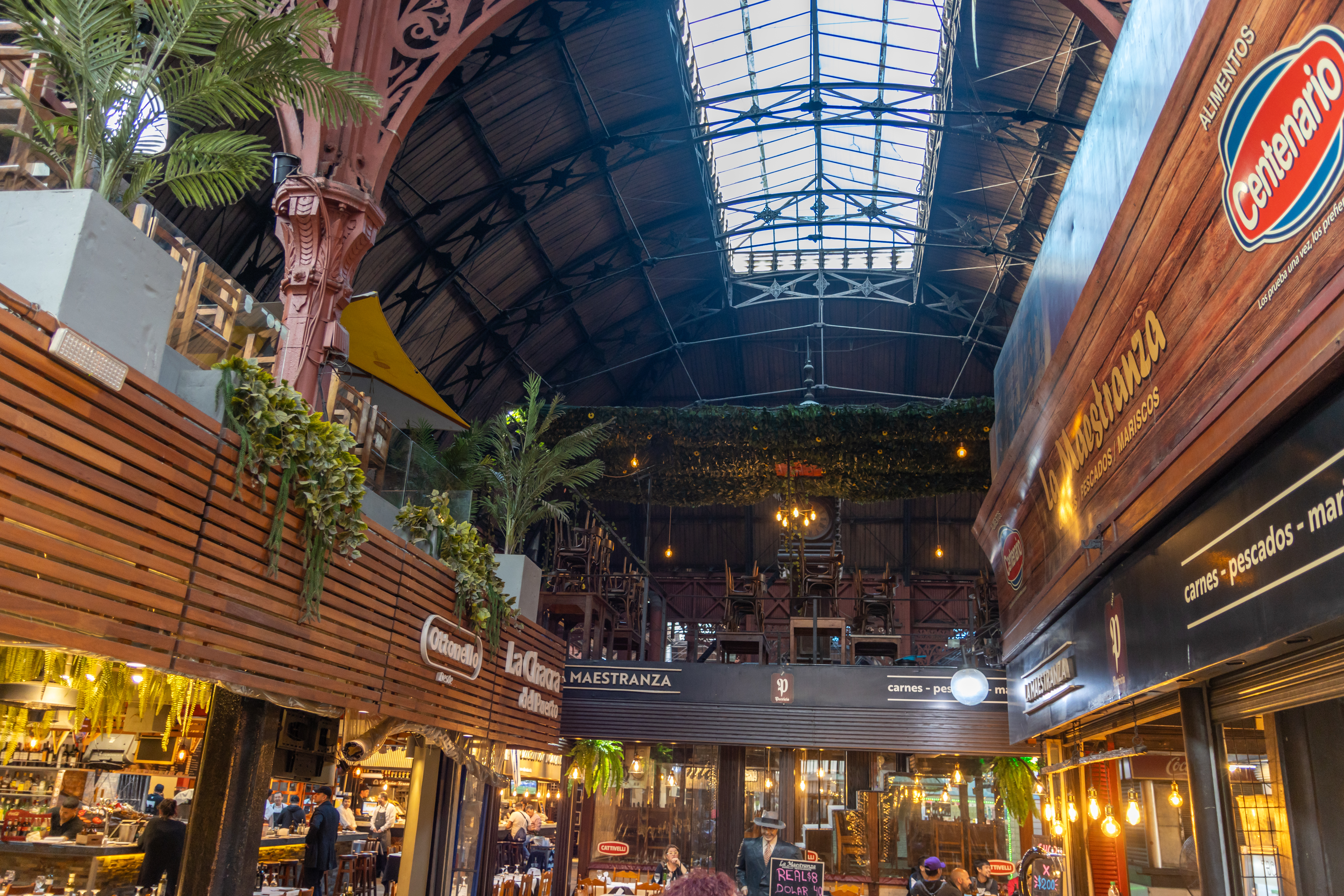
Market's interior

Established as a fruits and vegetables wholesale marketplace, it played a vital role in supplying both the port and the local population. At the heart of its interior once stood a circular iron fountain, later replaced in 1897 by a four-faced clock, also imported from Liverpool, which remains a distinctive feature of the building.

Over the course of the 20th century, the Mercado del Puerto underwent periods of both prosperity and decline. However, in the 1970s, it gradually shifted from a traditional market to a gastronomic and cultural hub. The former produce stalls were replaced by restaurants specializing in traditional Uruguayan cuisine, alongside souvenir shops. The building was designated a National Historic Monument in 1976.

Since its refurbishment, it has become a renowned gastronomic complex and a major tourist destination in the city, surrounded by museums, artisan shops, and cultural institutions. The Mercado del Puerto was the birthplace of the traditional Uruguayan drink Medio y Medio, a blend of sweet sparkling wine and dry white wine. First created in the late 19th century at the Roldós bar, it became a popular festive beverage and continues to be produced today in various styles.
