= Iglesia de Nuestra Señora de Lourdes y San Vicente Pallotti =

Roman Catholic parish church in Montevideo, Uruguay

Coordinates: 34°54′11″S 56°12′2.5″W

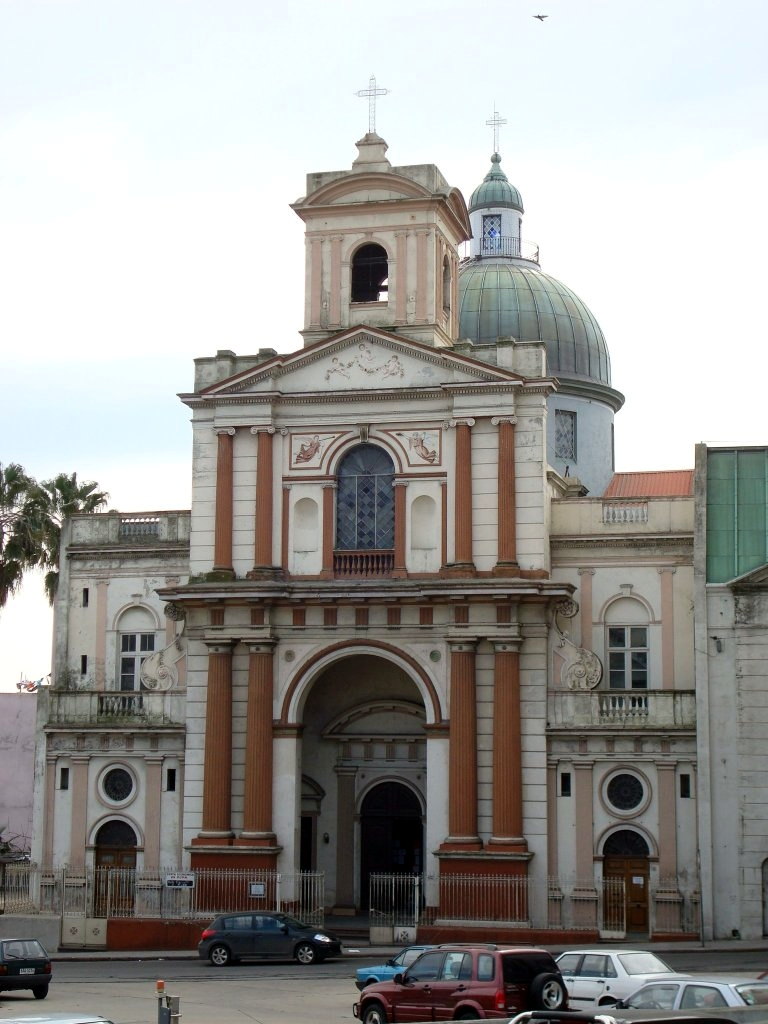

Religion
- Affiliation: Roman Catholic
- Ecclesiastical or organizational status: Parish church
- Year consecrated: 1890

Location
- Location: Paysandú 763; Montevideo, Uruguay
- Interactive map of Iglesia de Nuestra Señora de Lourdes y San Vicente Pallotti

Architecture
- Architect: Ignacio Pedralbes
- Type: Church
- Style: Neo-Baroque
- Direction of façade: South

The Church of Our Lady of Lourdes and Saint Vincent Pallotti (Spanish: Iglesia de Nuestra Señora de Lourdes y San Vicente Pallotti), popularly known as Iglesia de Lourdes, is a Roman Catholic parish church in Montevideo, Uruguay.

== Overview ==
Located on the intersection of the streets Paysandú and Florida, the temple was built between 1885 and 1890 by engineer Ignacio Pedralbes in a Neo-Baroque eclectic style, inspired in the churches of La Sorbonne and Saint Gervais in Paris.

The parish was established on 7 September 1962.

Held by the Pallottines, it is dedicated to their patron saint Vincent Pallotti and Our Lady of Lourdes.
