= Club Uruguay =

Gentlemen's club in Montevideo, Uruguay

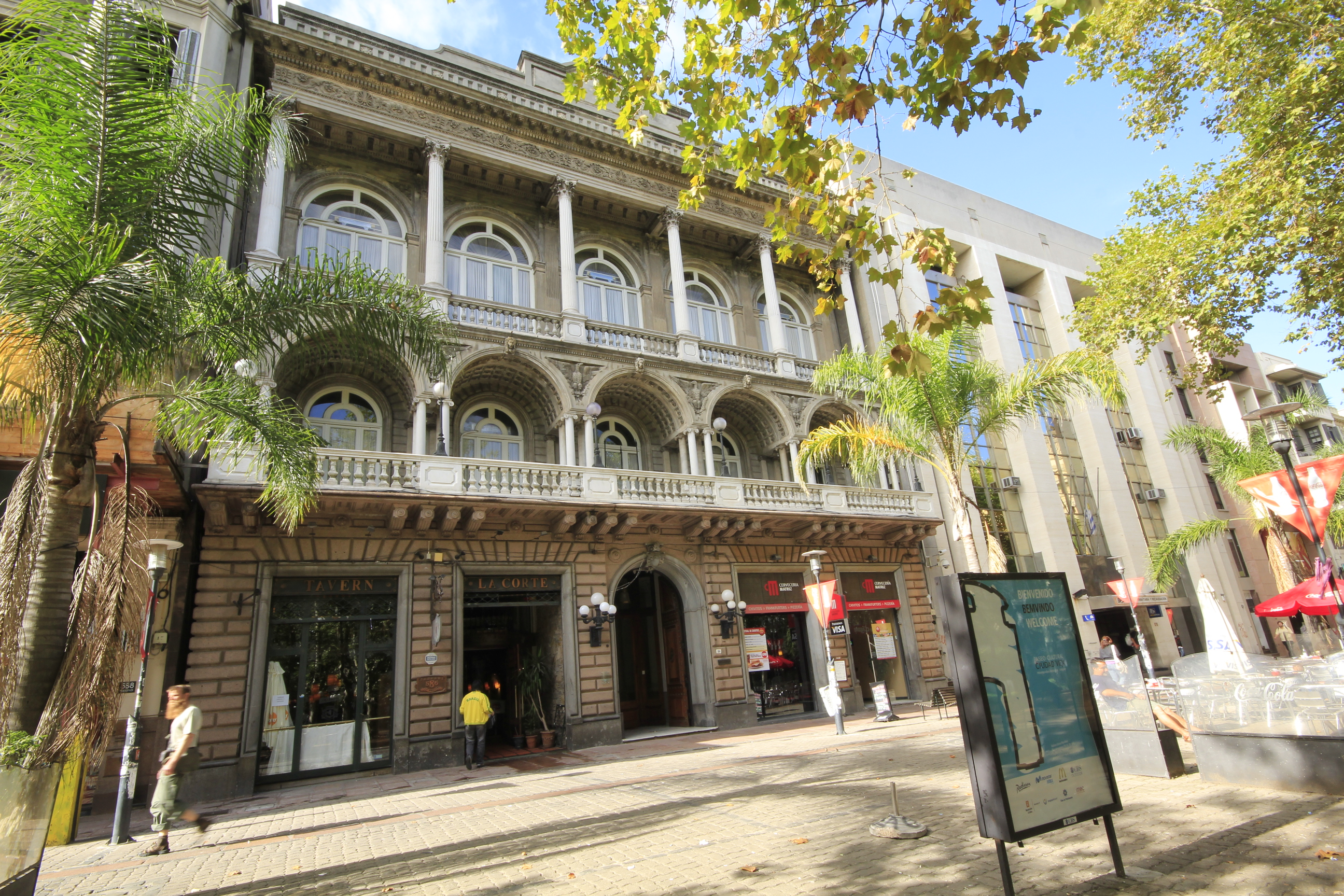
- Formation: 1878
- Type: Gentlemen's club
- Location: Sarandi 582, Ciudad Vieja

Club Uruguay is a gentlemen's club located in Montevideo, Uruguay.

== History ==
The club was founded in 1878, as a merger between the Casino de Comercio, whose members belonged to the business elite, and Club Libertad, which was a social haunt of the traditional upper-class.

== Building ==
Club Uruguay is based in a historic building in the old city that faces Constitution Square. The building is architecturally significant. Designed by Italian engineer Luigi Andreoni, it reflects renaissance, mannerist and baroque influences over its three floors.

It was declared a National Historic Monument in 1975.
