= General Artigas railway station =

Railway station in Montevideo, Uruguay

Coordinates: 34°54′01″S 56°11′40″W

General Artigas Central Station Estación Central General Artigas
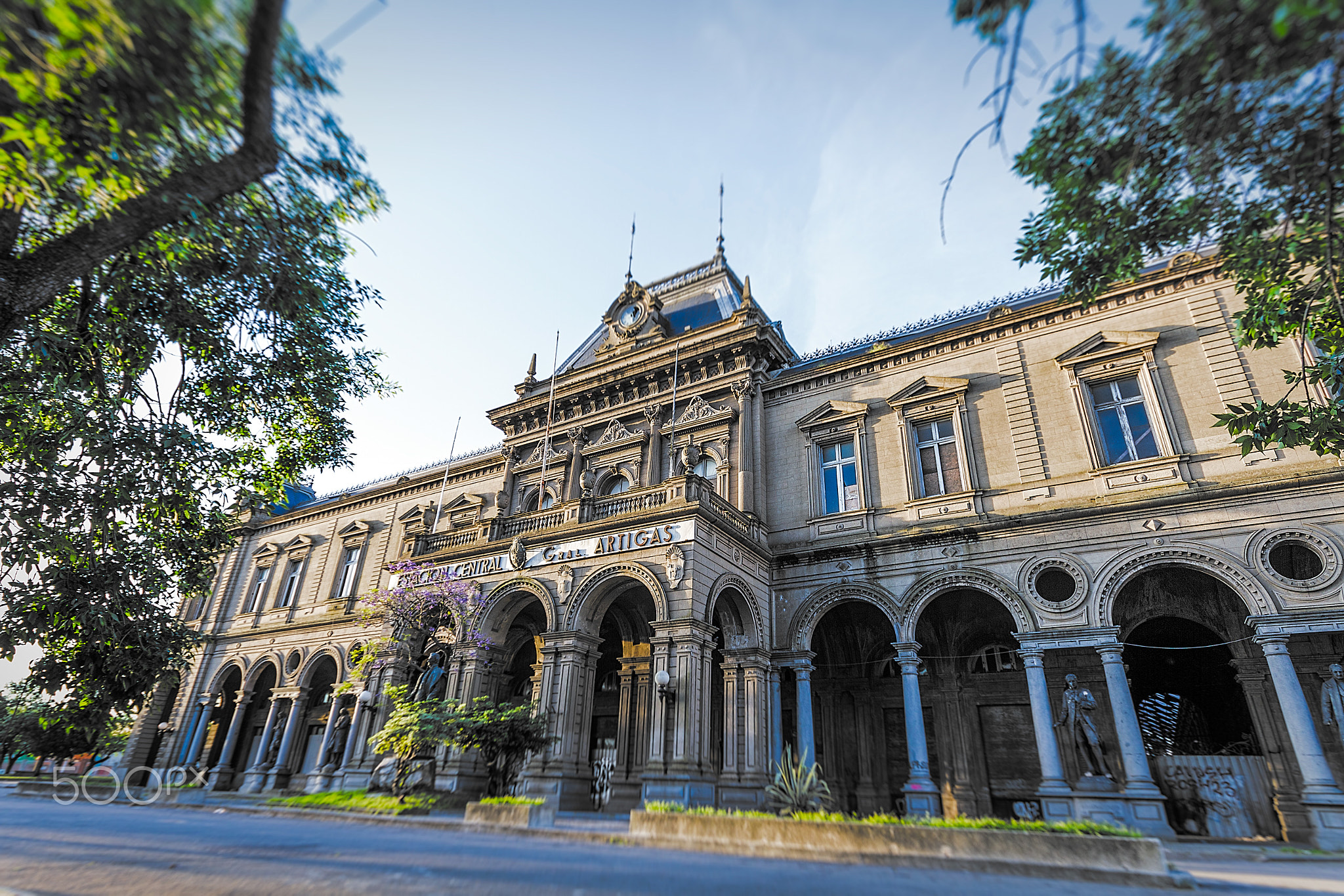
- Estación Central General Artigas

General information
- Location: Paraguay, La Paz, Rio Negro
- Elevation: 11 metres (36 ft)

History
- Opened: 23 June 1897
- Closed: 1 March 2003
Location

General Artigas railway station (Spanish: Estación Central General Artigas) is the former main railway station in Montevideo, Uruguay. Located in barrio Aguada, it was designed by the Italian engineer and architect Luigi Andreoni, it was opened to the public on 15 July 1897 and was closed on 1 March 2003, being replaced by a station 500 metres (1,600 ft) to the north. The building was declared a National Historic Monument in 1975.

Redevelopment or reactivation of the station and site has been plagued by administrative problems. The Passenger Group defending Montevideo Central Station has proposed to create a multimodal transportation center that combines trains with other forms of transportation.

== History ==
The Central Railway Company began construction of the station after a fire destroyed the old Montevideo station in 1891. The foundation stone was laid on 27 August 1893, and the building opened for passengers in 1897. The expansion of the station continued with connection to the maritime terminal tracks in 1912 after the completion of the works at the port of Montevideo. Additionally, land was reclaimed from the sea on the side of the boulevard, facilitating another connection nearly as far as Guatamala street. The ticket offices that were located on Rio Negro Street were moved to the large central hall.

The government renamed the station to José Artigas Central Station in 1955, this was changed to "General Artigas Central Station" in 1974. The station hall was modernised in 1977.

After passenger services were stopped in 1988, the station was used for exhibitions while the offices and freight yards remained active. It also hosted concerts by Duran Duran and Iron Maiden (among others).

Special passenger trains started up again in 1991, reaching various parts of the country. From 1993, there was a regular passenger service from the station to 25 de Agosto.

Montevideo Railway Station, a new, small station, was built 500 meters to the north of the old building, with construction beginning in 1999. Setbacks meant that the opening was delayed until 2003. The Central Station was abandoned after that.

== Reactivation ==
Since 1998, a group of citizens and residents of La Aguada, known as the Passenger Group defending Montevideo Central Station, has advocated for its reactivation. They collected nearly 7,000 signatures, which were presented to authorities in February 2009.

On 12 February 2007, the station was reconnected to the national railway network by removing a concrete cap installed in 2003 and replacing 20 meters of track.

In late 2008, work began to repair part of the maneuvering yard for port-bound rail traffic. One track was enabled in 2009 and three more in 2010, but operations were suspended in mid-2011 due to legal issues. Between October and November 2018, the station was reopened to the public for Heritage Day and it was very popular during the event. On 19 September 2019, 17 years after the last train had departed, limited train access to the station was restored to mark Railway Worker’s Day in Uruguay.

== Gallery ==
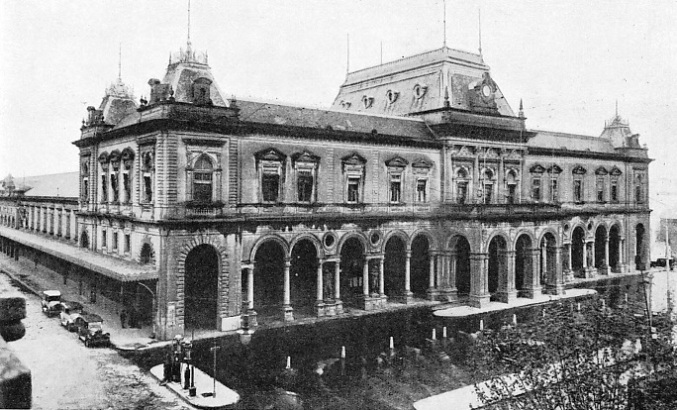

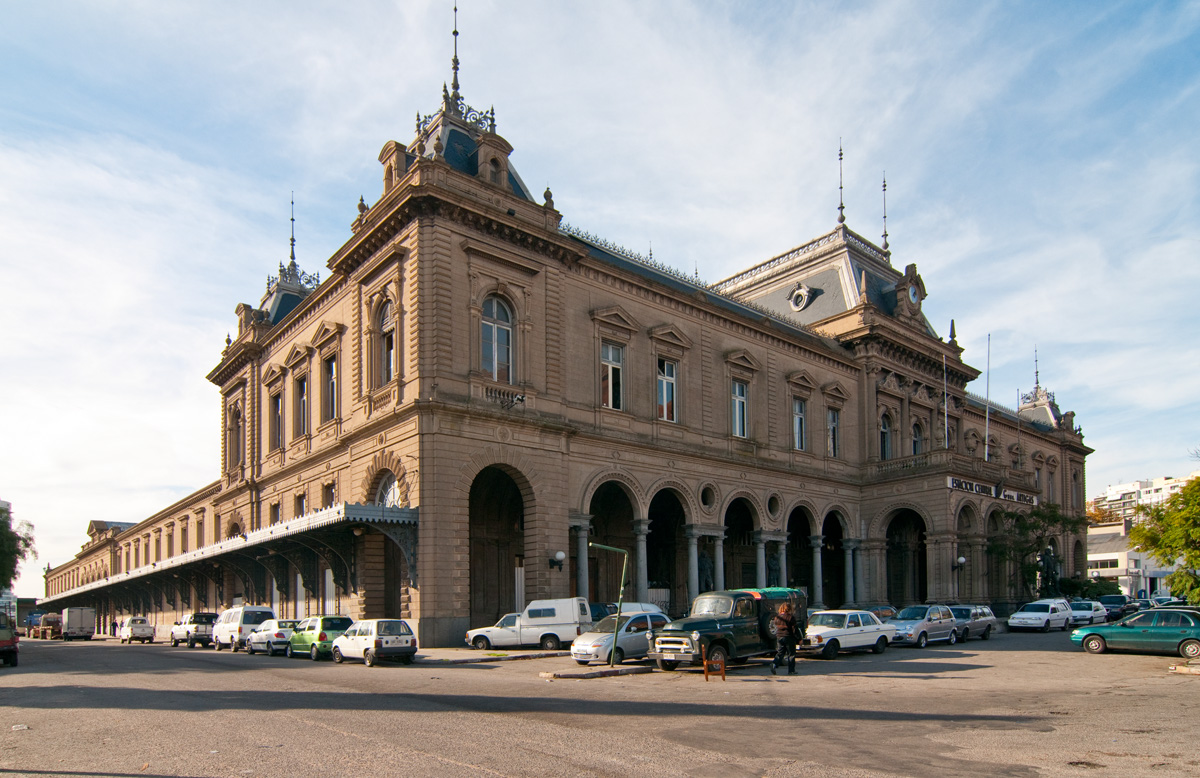

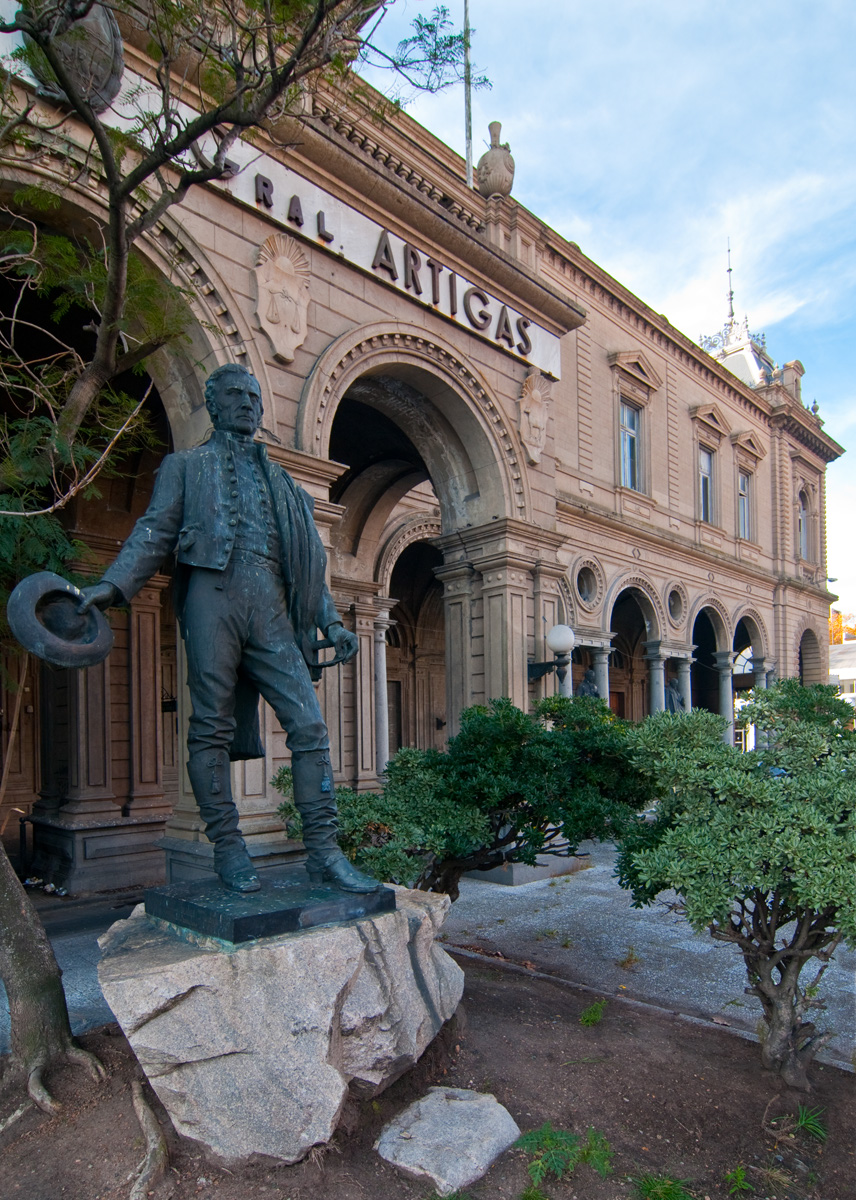
