= Constitution Square, Montevideo =

City square in Montevideo, Uruguay

Coordinates: 34°54′23.7″S 56°12′12.7″W

Constitution Square
- Plaza Matriz
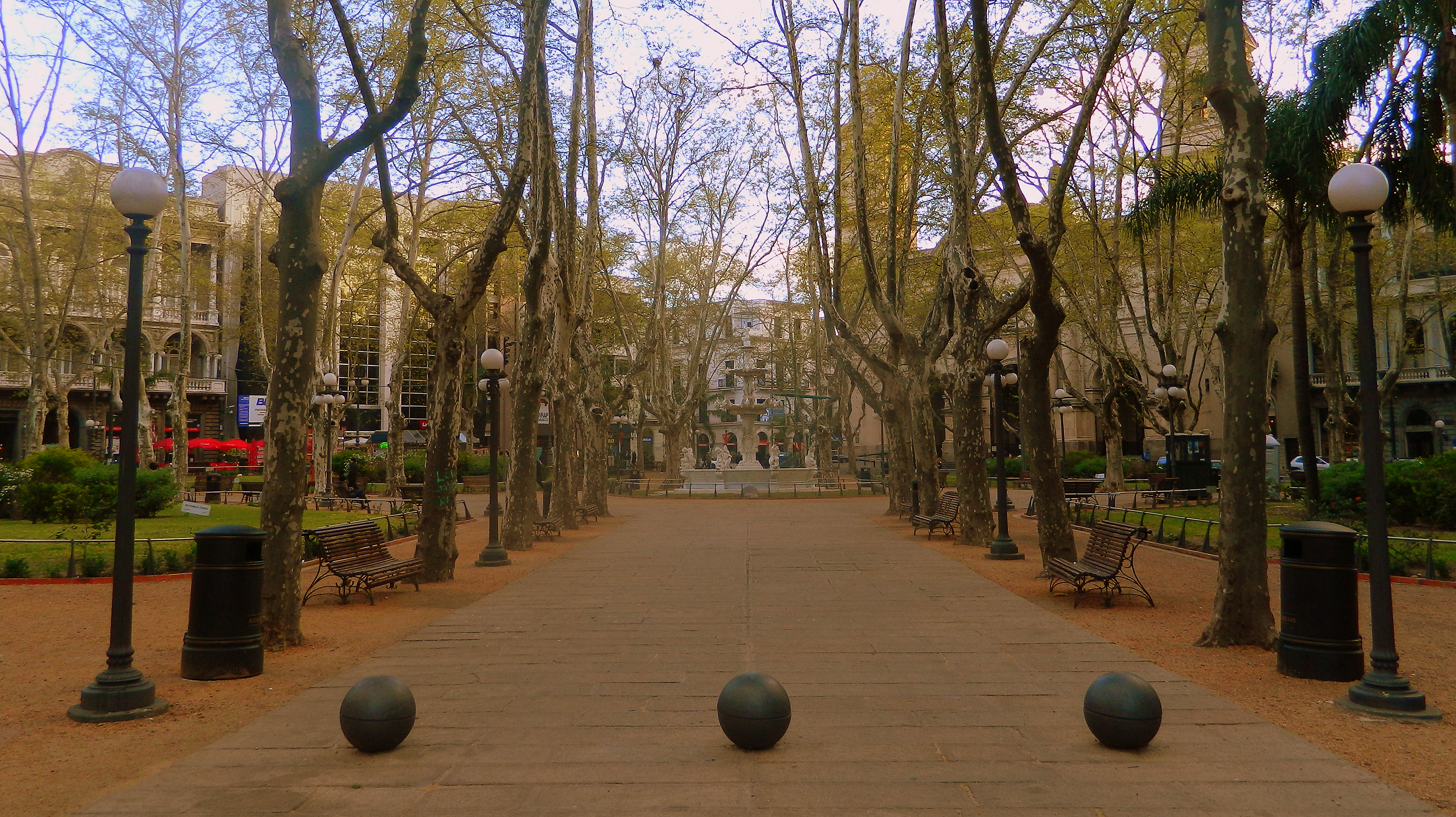
- Interactive map of Constitution Square
- Native name: Spanish: Plaza de la Constitución
- Location: Ciudad Vieja, Montevideo

Construction
- Inauguration: 1726

Plaza de la Constitución (Spanish for 'Constitution Square'), also known as Plaza Matriz, is the oldest city square in Montevideo, Uruguay.

Located in barrio Ciudad Vieja, since 1726 was the plaza mayor of the Fortress City of San Felipe and Santiago of Montevideo, in which it was the only open public space. It is the center of the city's historic district, and is surrounded by important buildings, such as the Metropolitan Cathedral and the Cabildo. It is, therefore, one of the most important tourist sites.

== History ==
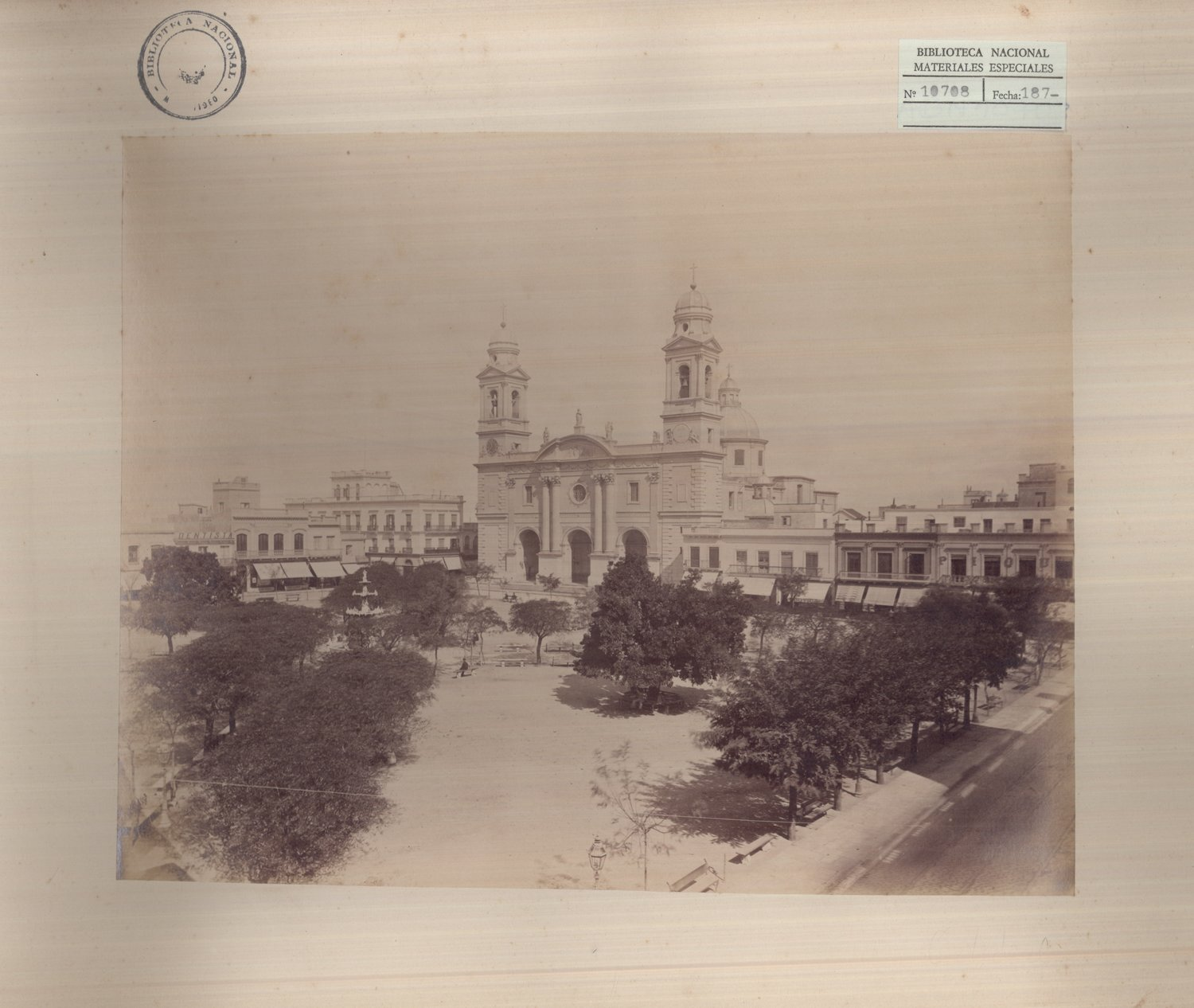
Constitution Square in 1870

Founded in 1726, two years after the founding of Montevideo, the square was a dusty plain until the end of the 18th century, when buildings were built around it. From that moment on, official events and celebrations, both civil and military, were held in the space, as well as bullfights, since a bullring was located in the square.

In 1851, the square was structured in a centralized way with diagonal paths lined with trees, paved and equipped with benches and lanterns.

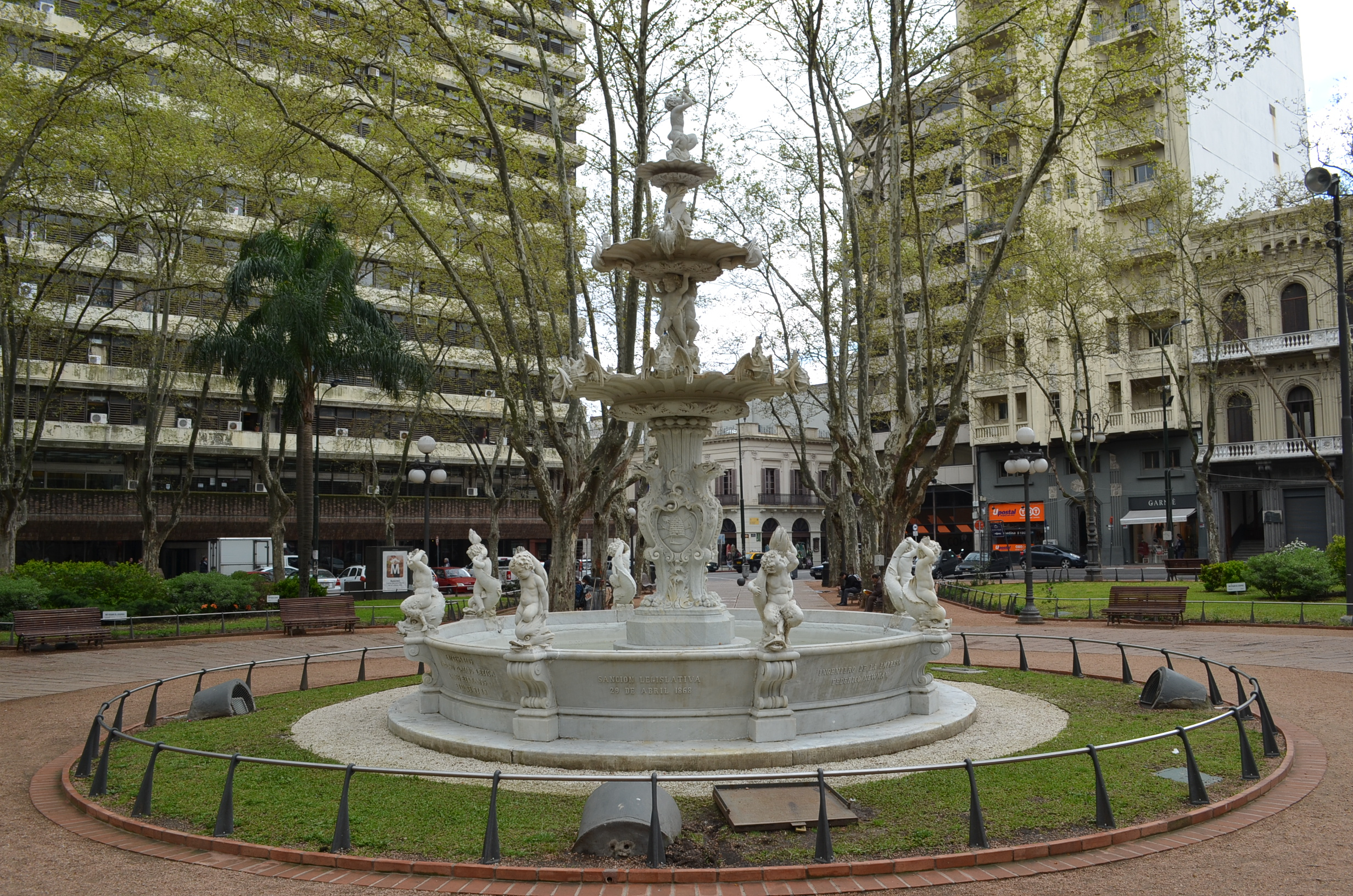
Central fountain of the square

In 1868, construction began on a steam pumping plant and a 60 km pipeline to supply the city with water. In addition, a fountain was built in the square to receive the water. On May 13, 1871, the water pumped from the Santa Lucía River to the Plaza Constitución arrived for the first time; Finally, the fountain was formally inaugurated by President Lorenzo Batlle y Grau on July 18. The fountain is a design by architect Juan Manuel Ferrari, and is composed of a circular pool with an ornate column at its center that takes the form of three dishes that open in decreasing size. In the center there are four griffins alternated with various symbolic elements, such as the National Coat of Arms.

In 2011 the central fountain was restored. It is currently the tourist and commercial axis of the barrio together with the Peatonal Sarandí. Nearby are offices, government buildings, banks, clothing stores, and cultural institutions.

== Geography ==
Surrounding the square are the Montevideo Metropolitan Cathedral, main Roman Catholic in the city to the west, and the Cabildo to the east. Also on the east is Casa Vaeza, headquarters of the National Party. To the south is the Peatonal Sarandí and Club Uruguay, while the headquarters of the Ministry of Transport and Public Works are to the north.

== Gallery ==
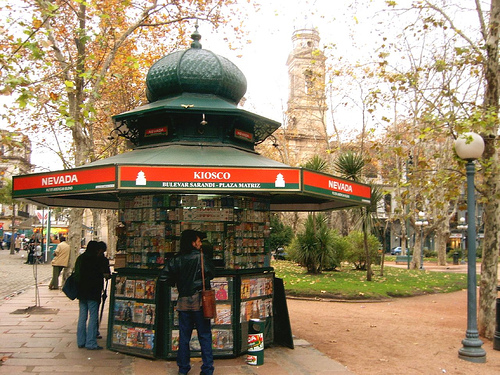
Characteristic kiosk of the city

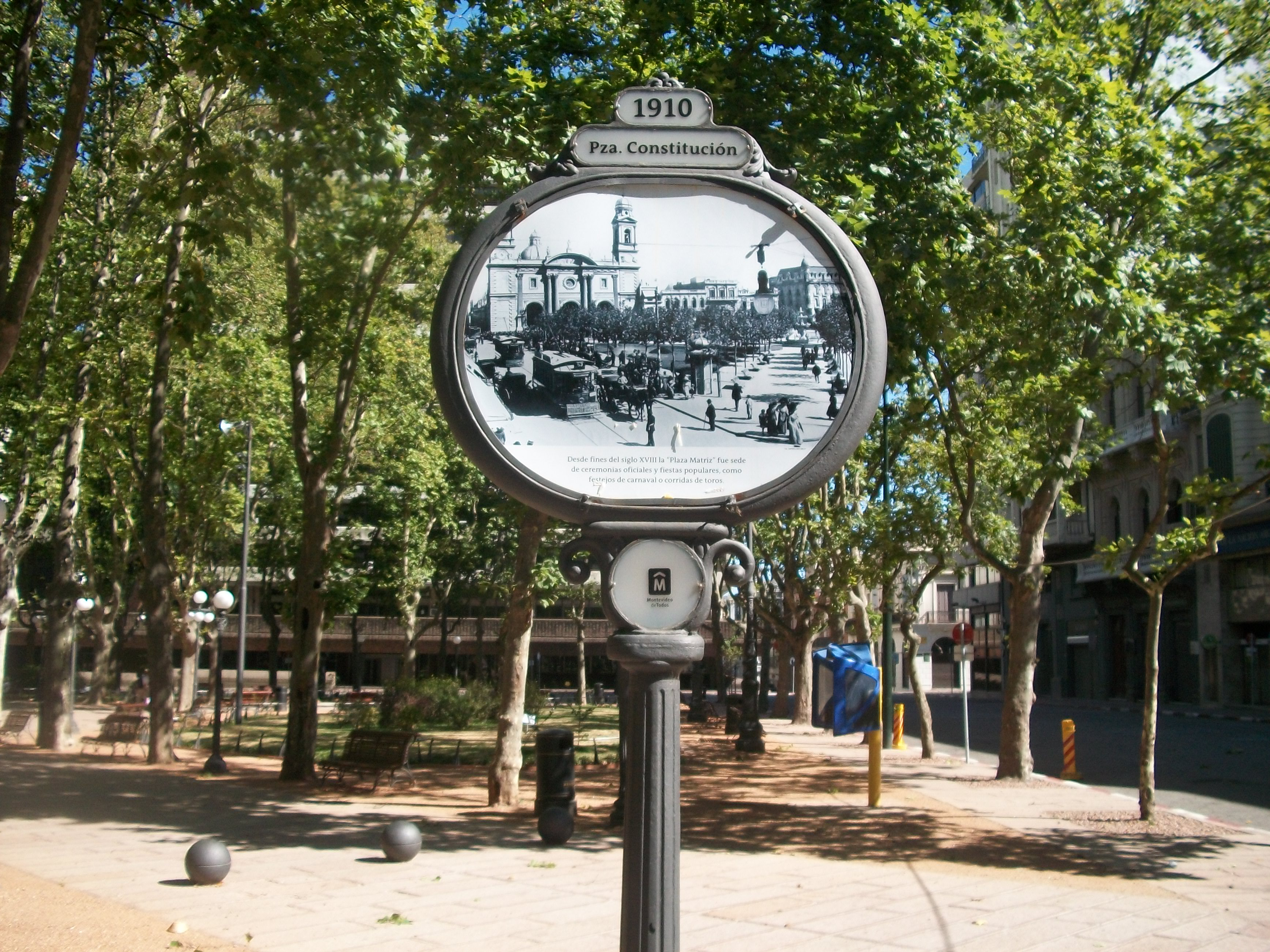
Square name sign

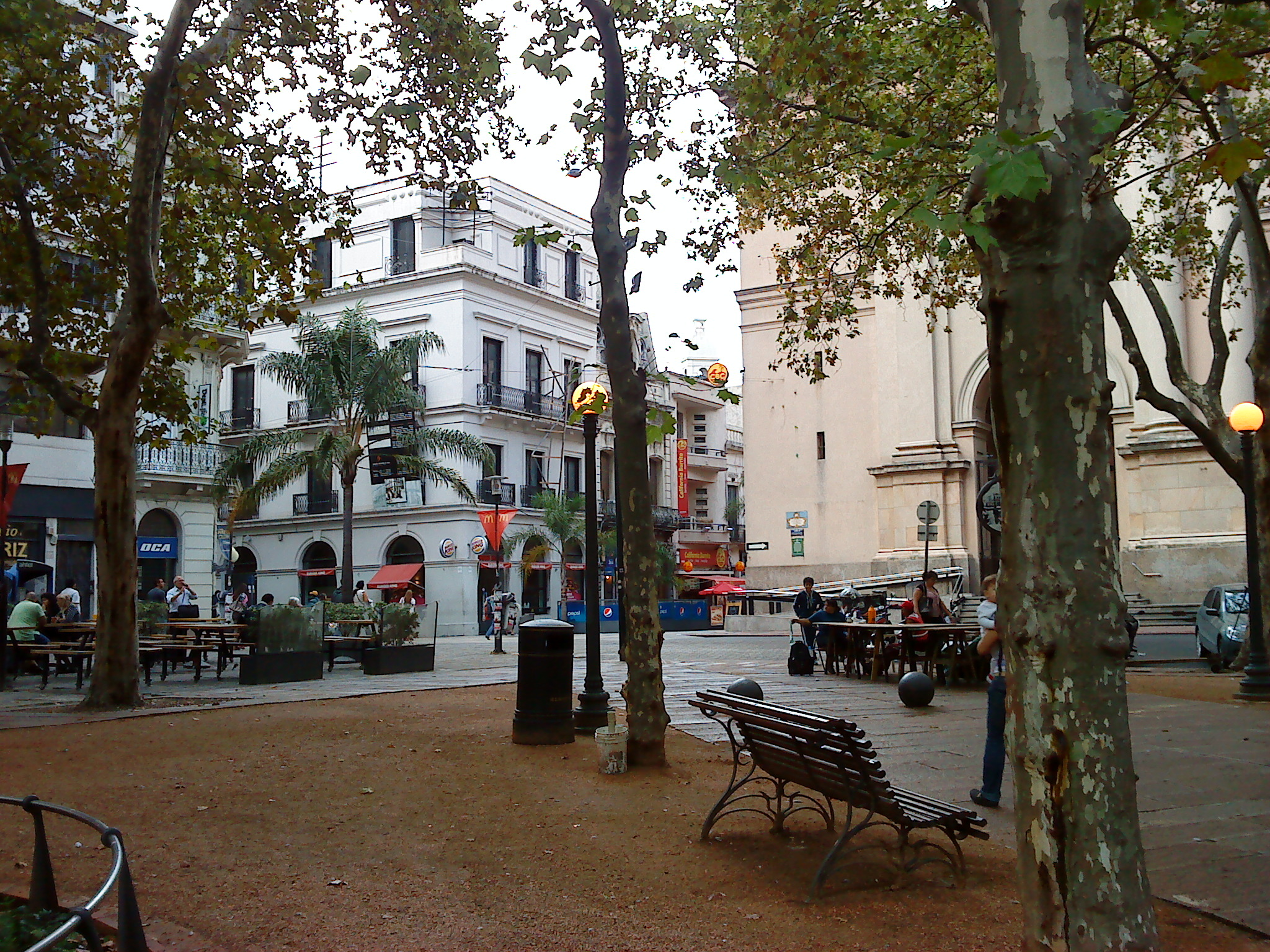
Building that housed the Pyramides Hotel

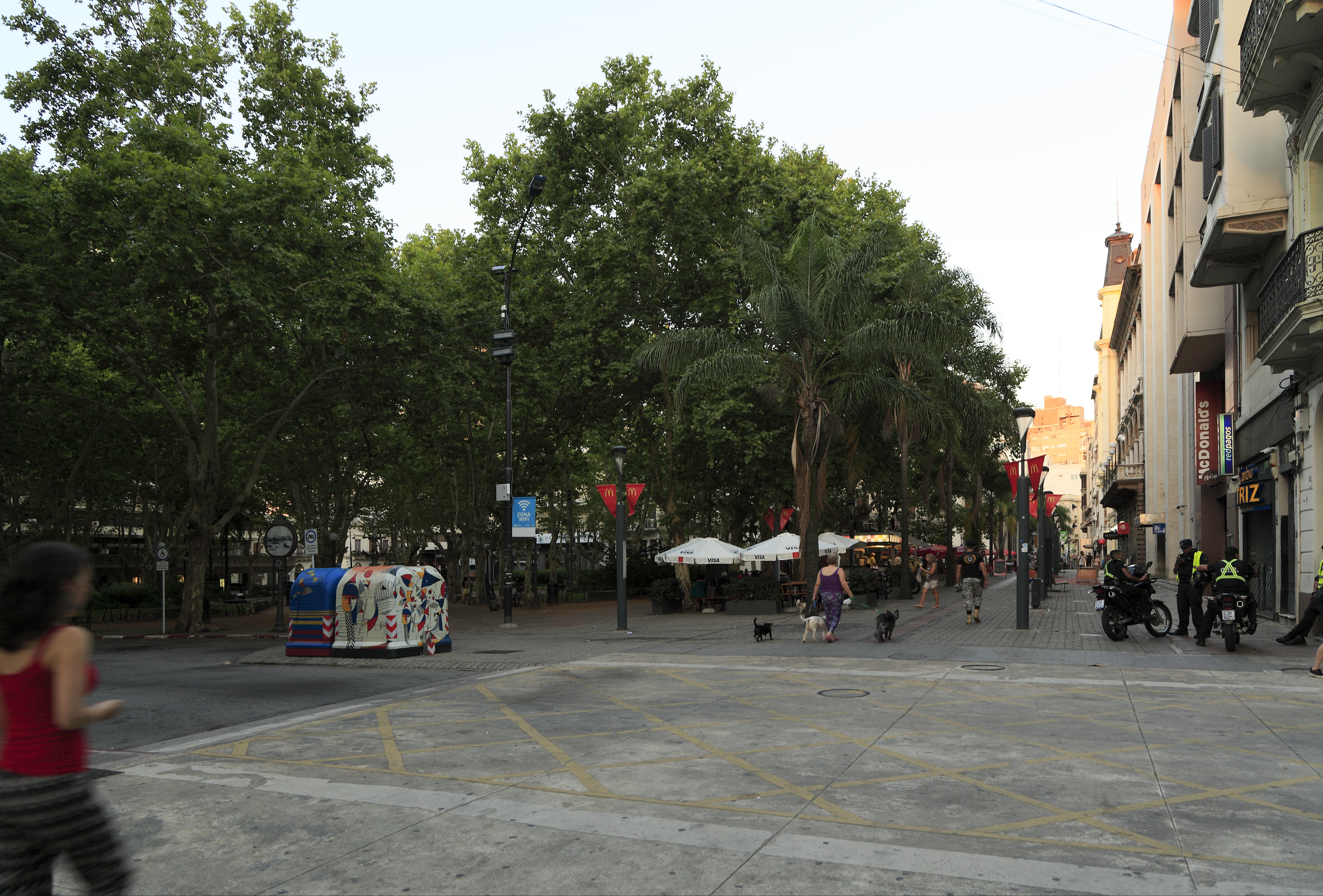
View of the square from the southwest side

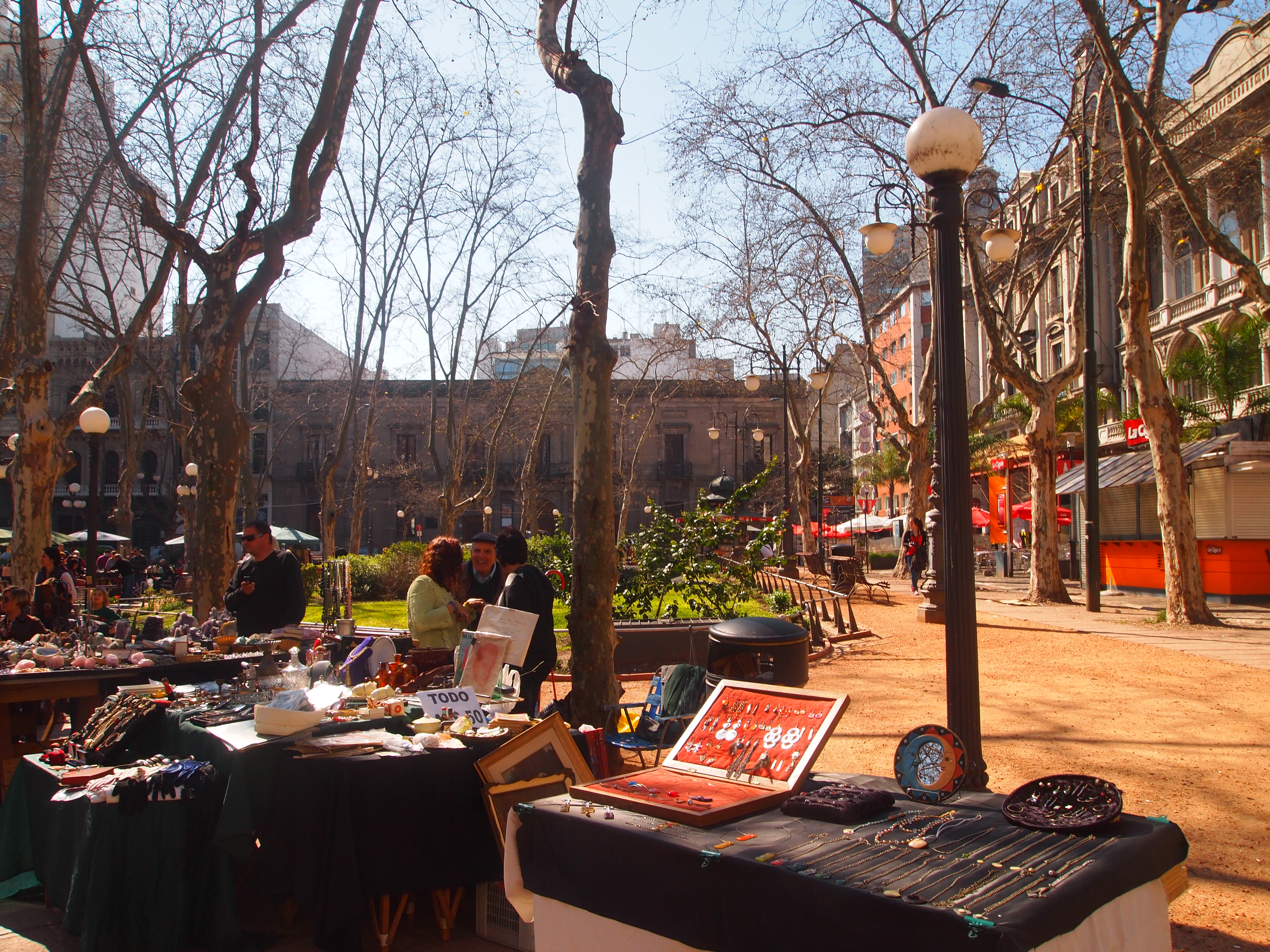
Flea market in the square
