= Palacio Taranco =

Coordinates: 34°54′25″S 56°12′30″W

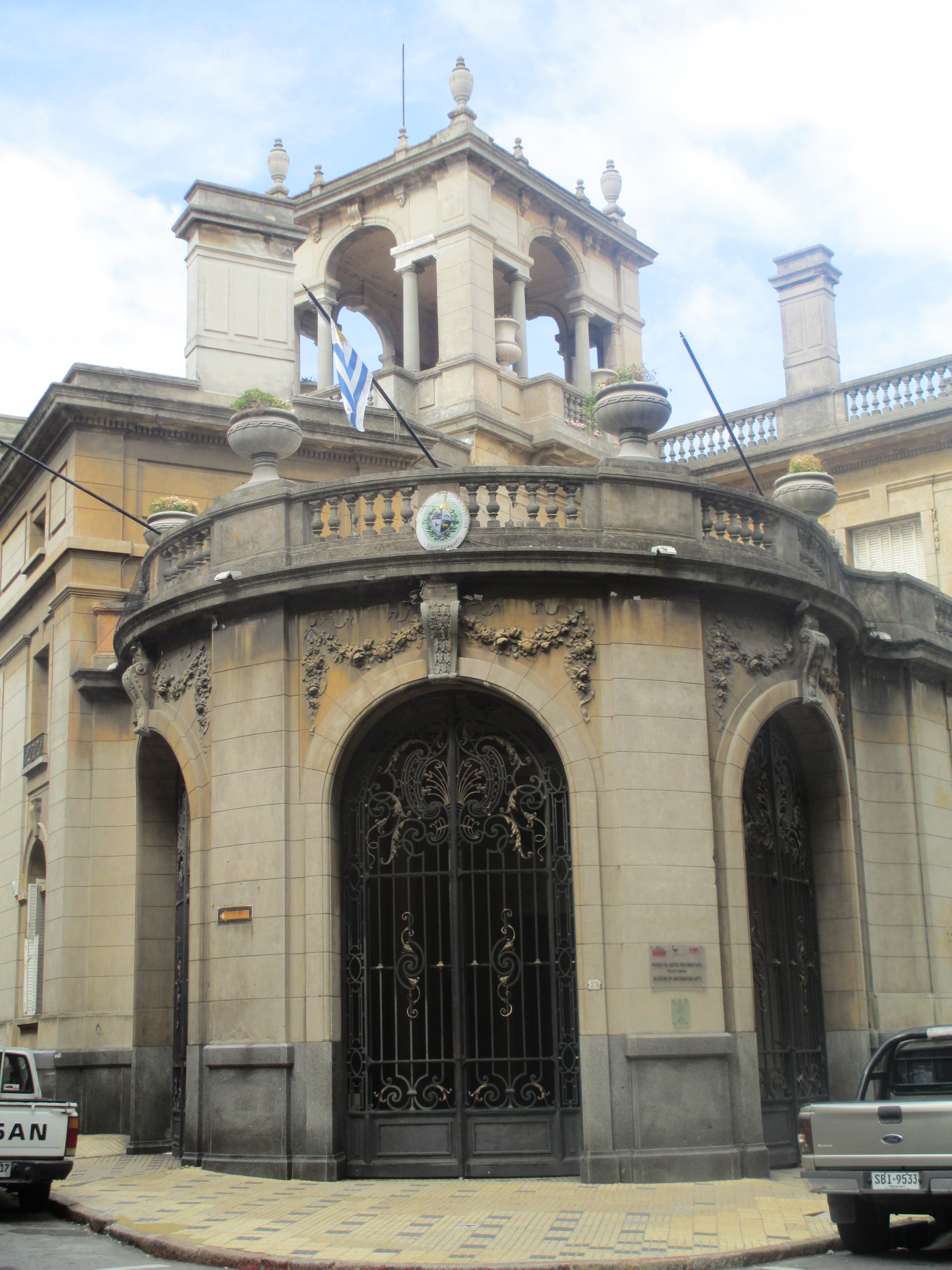
Palacio Taranco, Montevideo. Uruguay.

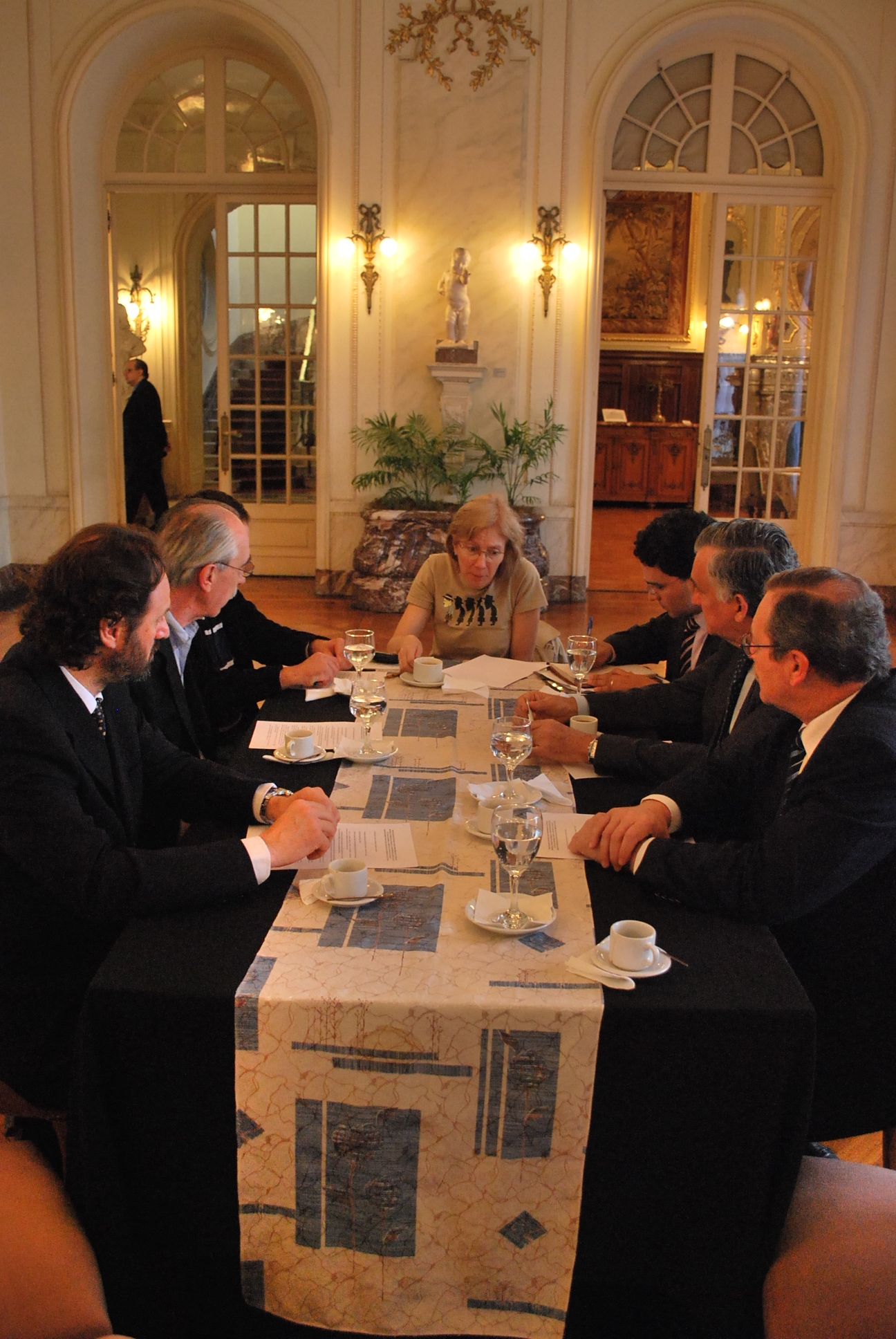
Uruguayan officials talking at a meeting at the Palacio Taranco, November 6, 2010

Palacio Taranco, located in front of the Plaza Zabala, in the heart of the Old City of Montevideo, Uruguay, is a palace erected in the early 20th century during a period in which the architectural style was influenced by French architecture. It was designed by French architects Charles Louis Girault and Jules Chifflot León, who also designed the Petit Palais and the Arc de Triomphe in Paris. This building contains European furniture and drapings and currently contains the Museum of Decorative Arts in Montevideo. The palace is often used as a meeting place by the Uruguayan government.

The palace was erected on the site of Montevideo's first theatre in the historical centre of the city which had been built in 1793. The Taranco Ortiz family commissioned the construction of the building in 1907 and it was completed in 1910. In 1943 the Uruguayan state purchased the residence and part of the furniture and gained access to its works of art, but it wasn't until 1972 that it became a museum, and it was declared a National Historic Landmark in 1975.

The Museum of Decorative Arts contains various paintings, sculptures, textiles, ornaments, and European furniture. On the ground floor and first floor of the building can be found some of the furniture of Louis XV and Louis XVI finely inlaid; the works of Ribera (1591–1652), Teniers (1610–1690), Mierevelt (1567–1641), Van der Helst (1613–1670), Appiani (1754–1817), Pradilla (1846–1921), Zuloaga (1870–1945), and Sorolla (1863–1923); Benlliure sculptures (1862–1947), Bouchard (1875–1969), Landowski (1875–1961), Vermare (1899–1919) etc. The Decorative Arts Museum has an important collection of Classical Art and Archaeology in the basement, consisting of artifacts of ceramics, glass, and bronzes and various items related to Greco-Roman and Near East art and archaeology. The museum also has collections of various textiles, from Persian curtains to Flemish tapestries, and has various ointments, oils, and perfumes.
