= Montevideo Cabildo =

Coordinates: 34°54′23.4″S 56°12′9.7″W

- Cabildo de Montevideo
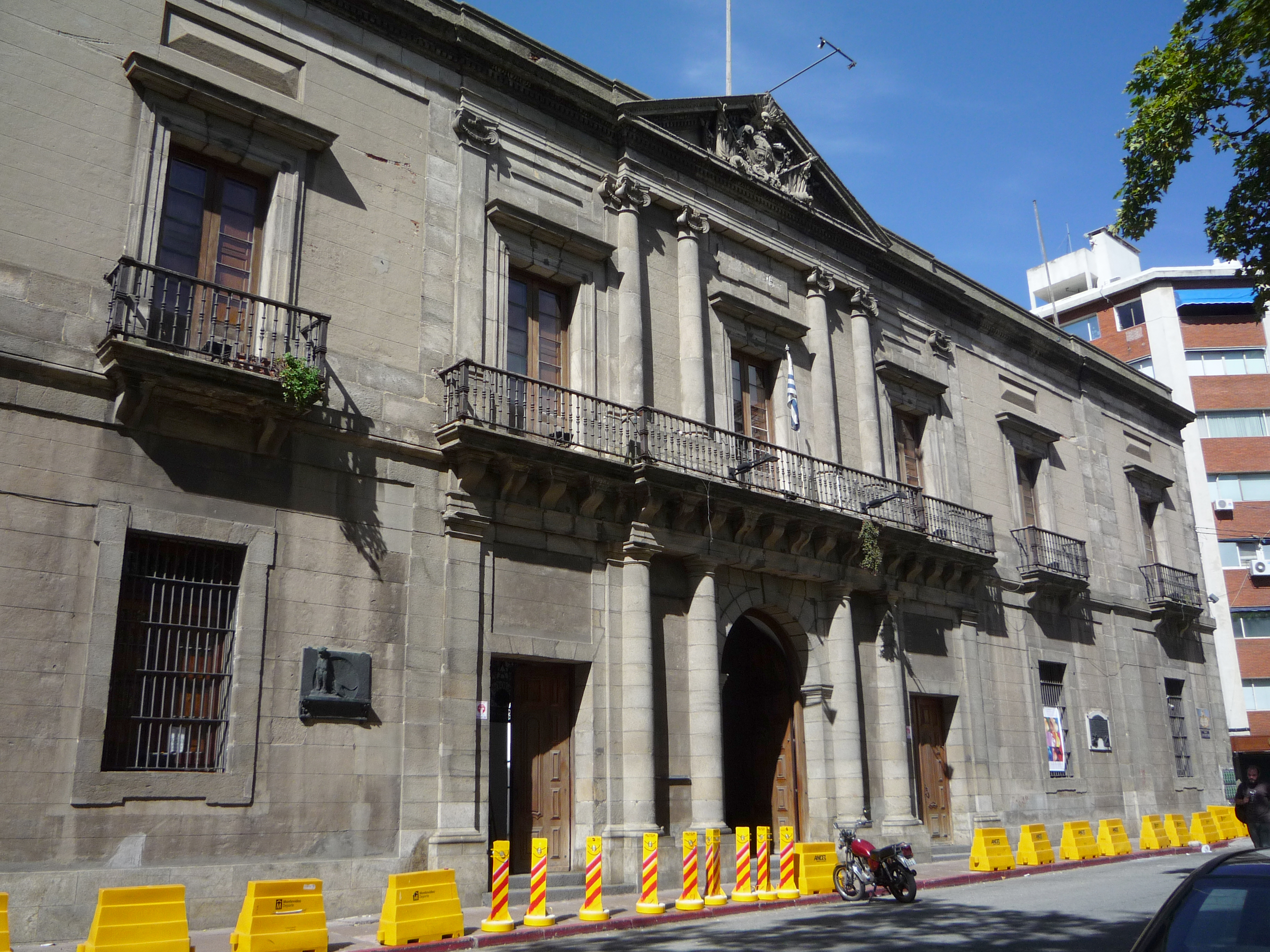
- Interactive map of the Montevideo Cabildo area

General information
- Type: Museum
- Architectural style: Spanish Colonial architecture
- Location: Constitution Square, Montevideo (Uruguay)
- Owner: Government of Uruguay

The Montevideo Cabildo (Spanish language: Cabildo de Montevideo) is the public building in Montevideo that was used as the government house during the colonial times of the Viceroyalty of the River Plate. Today the building is used as a museum and houses the Historical Archive of the city. It is located on Constitution Square, in Ciudad Vieja.
