= Ciudad Vieja, Montevideo =

Ciudad Vieja
- Historic City Centre
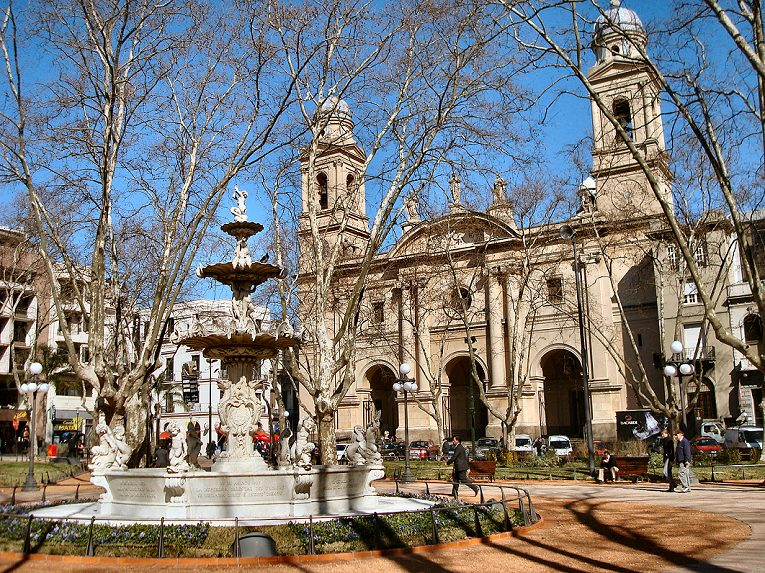
- Constitution Square and the Metropolitan Cathedral

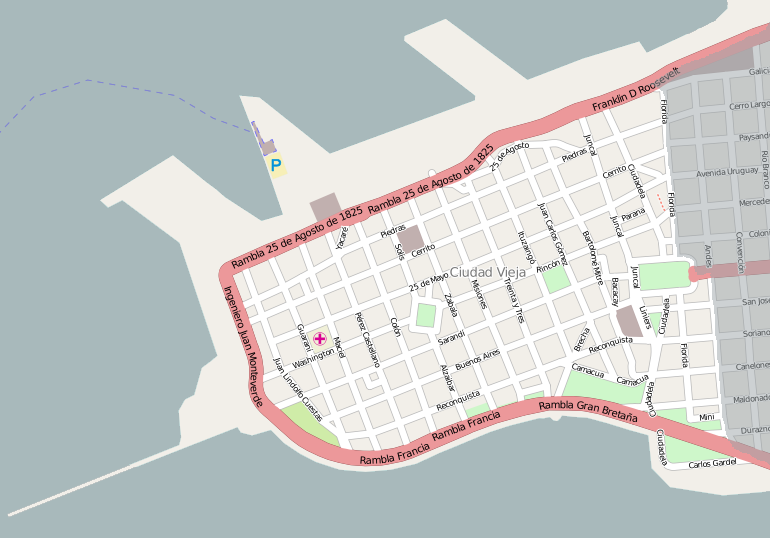
- Street map of Ciudad Vieja

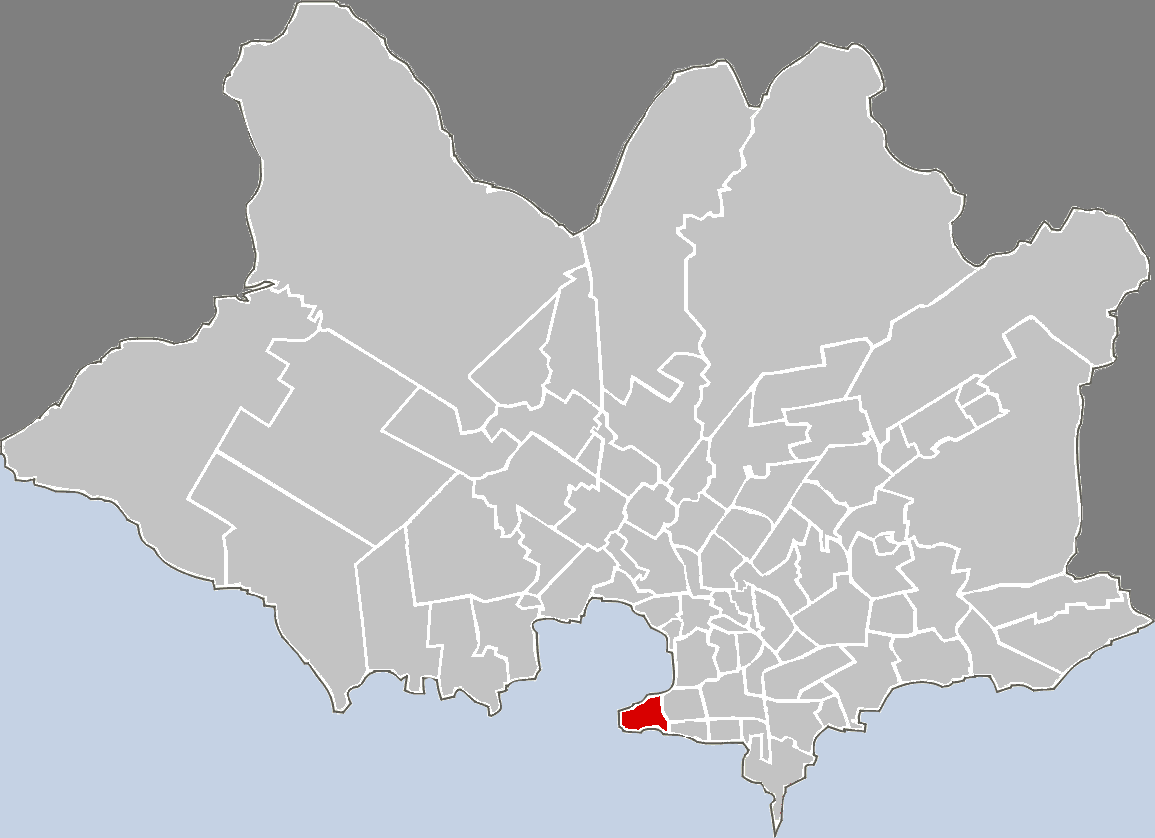
- Location of Ciudad Vieja in Montevideo
- Coordinates: 34°54′24″S 56°12′30″W
- Country: Uruguay
- Department: Montevideo Department
- City: Montevideo

Population
  - Total: 12,500

Ciudad Vieja (Spanish pronunciation: [sjuˈðað ˈβjexa], Old City) is a barrio (neighbourhood or district) in Montevideo, the capital of Uruguay. Located in a peninsula at the entrance of the natural port of Montevideo it was founded in 1724 as a walled city by the Spanish Empire. After the independence of Uruguay the city rapidly grew outwards and the Ciudad Vieja remained as one of its central neighbourhoods.

Alongside Centro, it functions as one of the city’s main office districts, housing numerous commercial banks, financial institutions, government buildings, as well as museums, cultural venues, theaters, and art galleries. The area is characterized by a notable concentration of Art Deco, Art Nouveau, and Neoclassical architecture, and constitutes one of the country’s main tourist attractions due to its historical significance.

== History ==
Until 1829 it was surrounded by a wall that protected it from possible invasions. After the wall was torn down, the only part of it that was preserved was the main gateway to the Citadel, which remains to this day as an emblem of Montevideo. Some street names recall the presence of the wall, like Ciudadela (citadel) or Brecha (breach), which owns its name to the breach in the wall that the British managed to open to enter the city during the 1807 British invasion and brief occupation of the city before they were defeated.

== Present ==
The main street, Sarandí, was turned into a pedestrian walkway in 1992, which increased its commercial and tourist attractiveness. In 2005 it was extended to beyond the Constitution Square.

Ciudad Vieja has buildings from the colonial era and the first decades of independence. The Cabildo (built between 1804 and 1812), the Solís Theatre, the Metropolitan Cathedral and several museums, like the Museo Torres García are among the most notable ones. Also several design shops and recycled loft floors can be seen on the streets near the port.

== Important buildings ==
- Bolsa de Valores de Montevideo
- Cabildo de Montevideo
- Mercado del Puerto
- Palacio Taranco
- Central Bank of Uruguay
- Solís Theatre
- Cathedral of the Immaculate Conception, St. Philip and St. James (head of the Roman Catholic Church in Uruguay)
- Parish Church of St. Francis of Assisi (Roman Catholic)
- Church of Our Lady of Lourdes and St. Vincent Pallotti (Roman Catholic, Pallottines)
- Cathedral of The Most Holy Trinity, popularly known as the English Temple (Anglican)
- Sephardic Jewish Community (Synagogue)

== Gallery ==
The Gateway of Ciudadela, was the entrance to the fortress of Montevideo

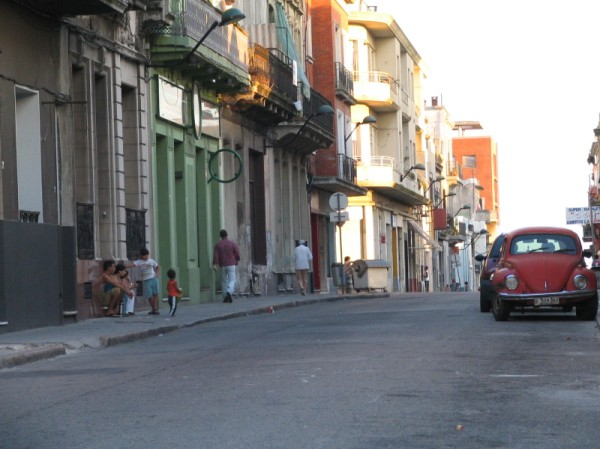
Street in the Ciudad Vieja

== See also ==
- Montevideo
- Colonia del Sacramento
- Barrios of Montevideo

== Bibliography ==
- Assunção, Fernando O.; Bombet Franco, Iris (1991). Ciudad Vieja. Cuadernos del Boston (in Spanish). Vol. 1. Montevideo.
