= Aires Puros =

- Barrio
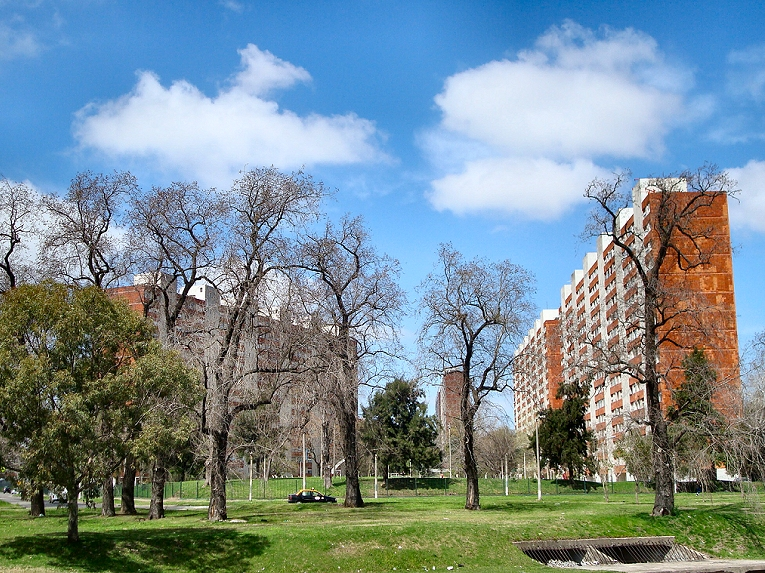
- The Parque Posadas residential complex

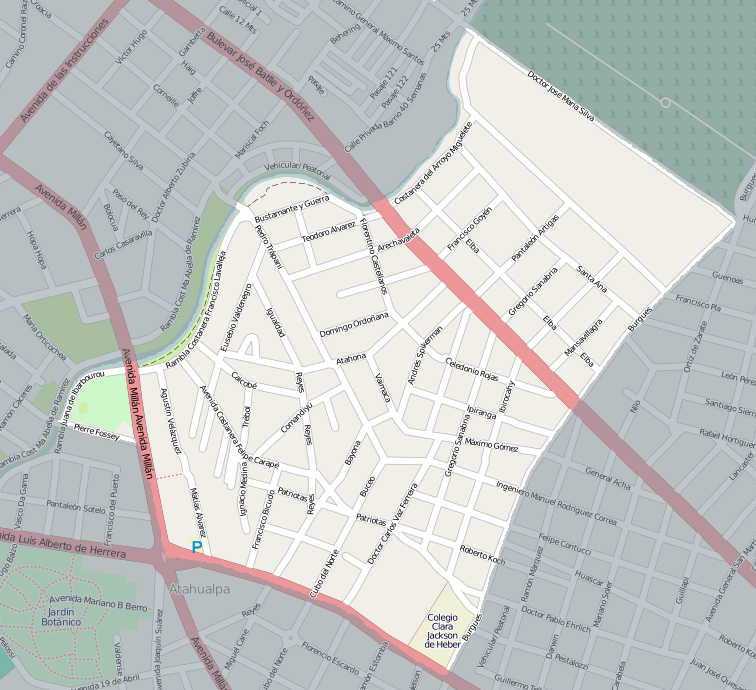
- Street map of Aires Puros

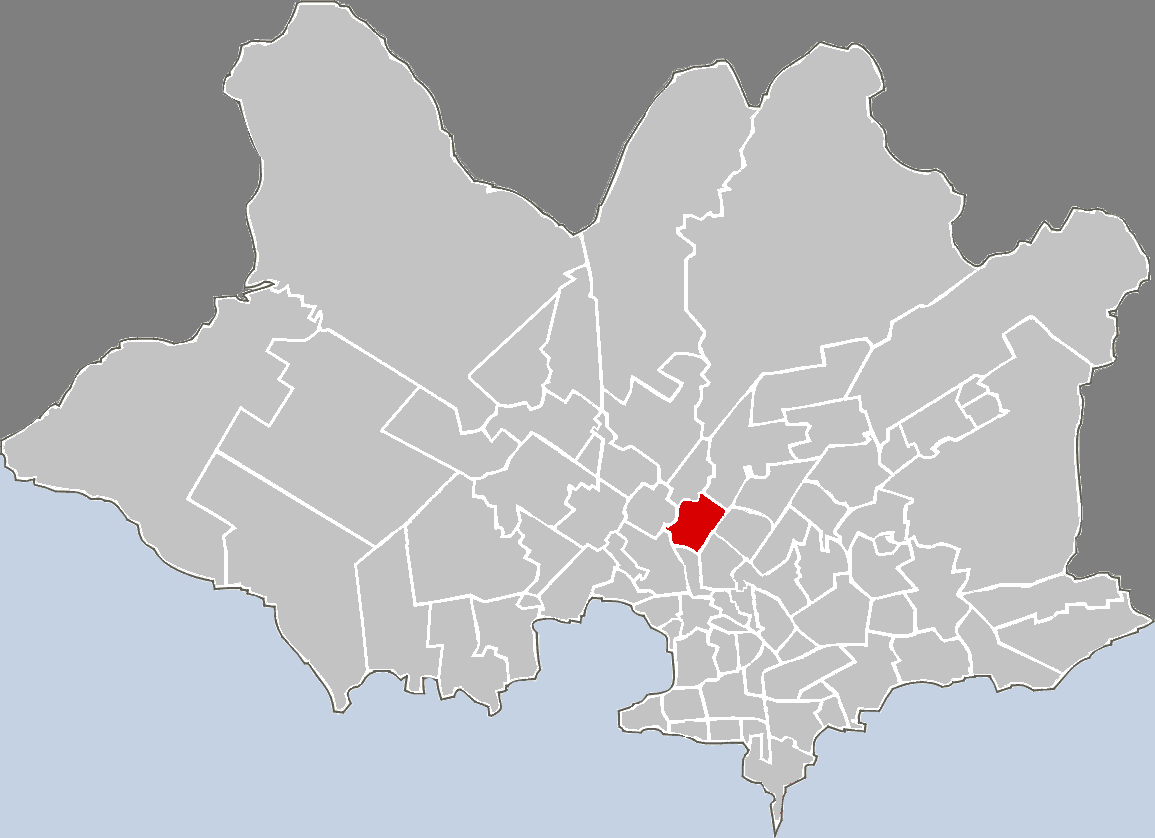
- Location of Aires Puros in Montevideo
- Coordinates: 34°51′7″S 56°11′18″W
- Country: Uruguay
- Department: Montevideo Department
- City: Montevideo

Aires Puros is a barrio (neighbourhood or district) of Montevideo, Uruguay.

== Location ==
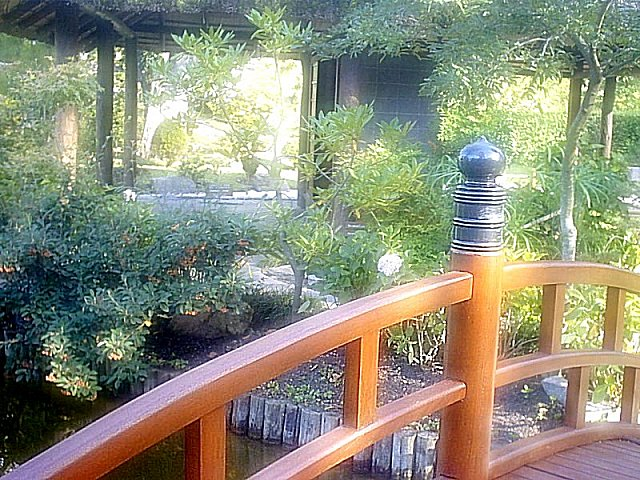
Japanese Garden at the J.M.Blanes Museum

It borders Lavalleja and Paso de las Duranas to the northwest, Casavalle to the northeast, Cerrito and Brazo Oriental to the southeast, Atahualpa and Prado to the southeast. Its northwest border is the Miguelete creek with Millan Avenue crossing it over the historic Paso de las Duranas bridge.

Just south of the bridge, is the northeast end of Prado park, where the famous Juan Manuel Blanes Museum and the Japanese Garden are located. Across them is the Parque Posadas residential complex of buildings.

== Educational facilities ==
- Colegio y Liceo Clara Jackson de Heber, Luis Alberto de Herrera 4142 (private, Roman Catholic, Dominican Sisters of the Annunciation of the Blessed Virgin)

== Places of worship ==
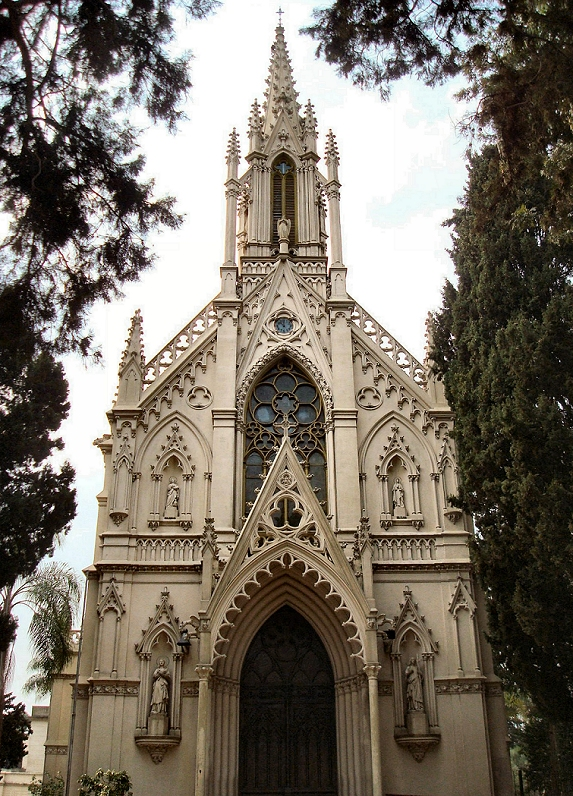
Capilla Jackson, Aires Puros

- Parish Church of the Holy Family, popularly known as "Capilla Jackson" (Roman Catholic, Jesuit)
- Parish Church of St. Madeleine Sophie Barat, also known as "Parroquia Aires Puros" (Roman Catholic)

== See also ==
- Barrios of Montevideo
