= Bañados de Carrasco =

- Barrio
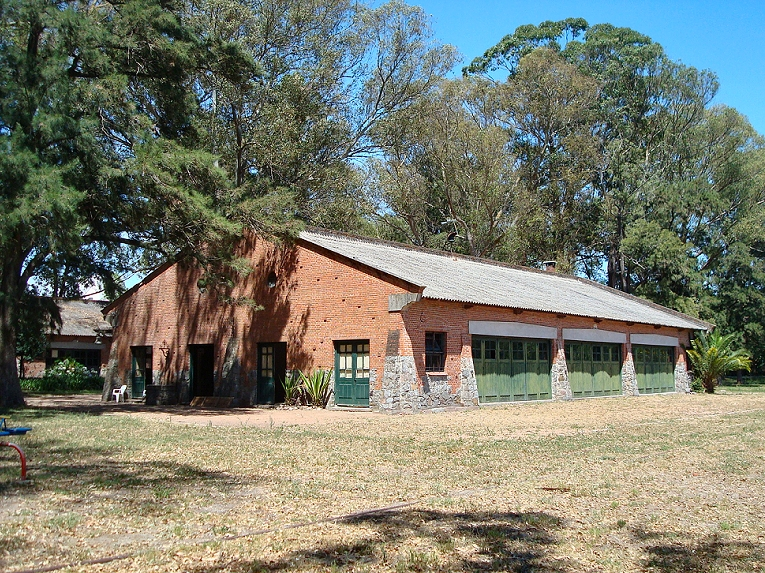
- Carriage Museum in Parque Fernando García

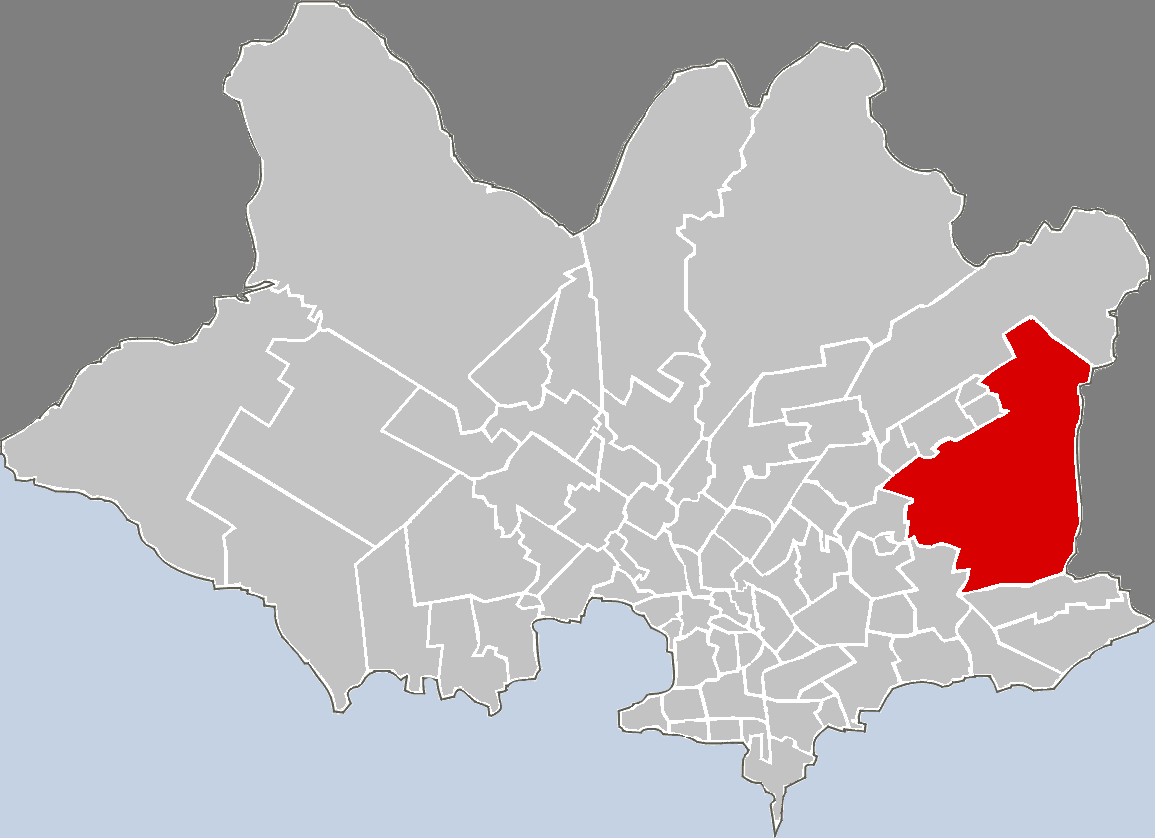
- Location of Bañados de Carrasco in Montevideo
- Coordinates: 34°50′31″S 56°4′52″W
- Country: Uruguay
- Department: Montevideo Department
- City: Montevideo

Bañados de Carrasco is a barrio (neighbourhood or district) of Montevideo, Uruguay.

== Location ==
Bañados de Carrasco borders Las Canteras to the southwest, Flor de Maroñas and Jardines del Hipódromo to the west, Punta de Rieles - Bella Italia to the northwest, Villa García - Manga Rural to the north, the Canelones Department to the east, and Carrasco Norte to the south.

== See also ==
- Barrios of Montevideo
