= Parque Prado =

Park in Montevideo, Uruguay

Coordinates: 34°51′28″S 56°12′29″W

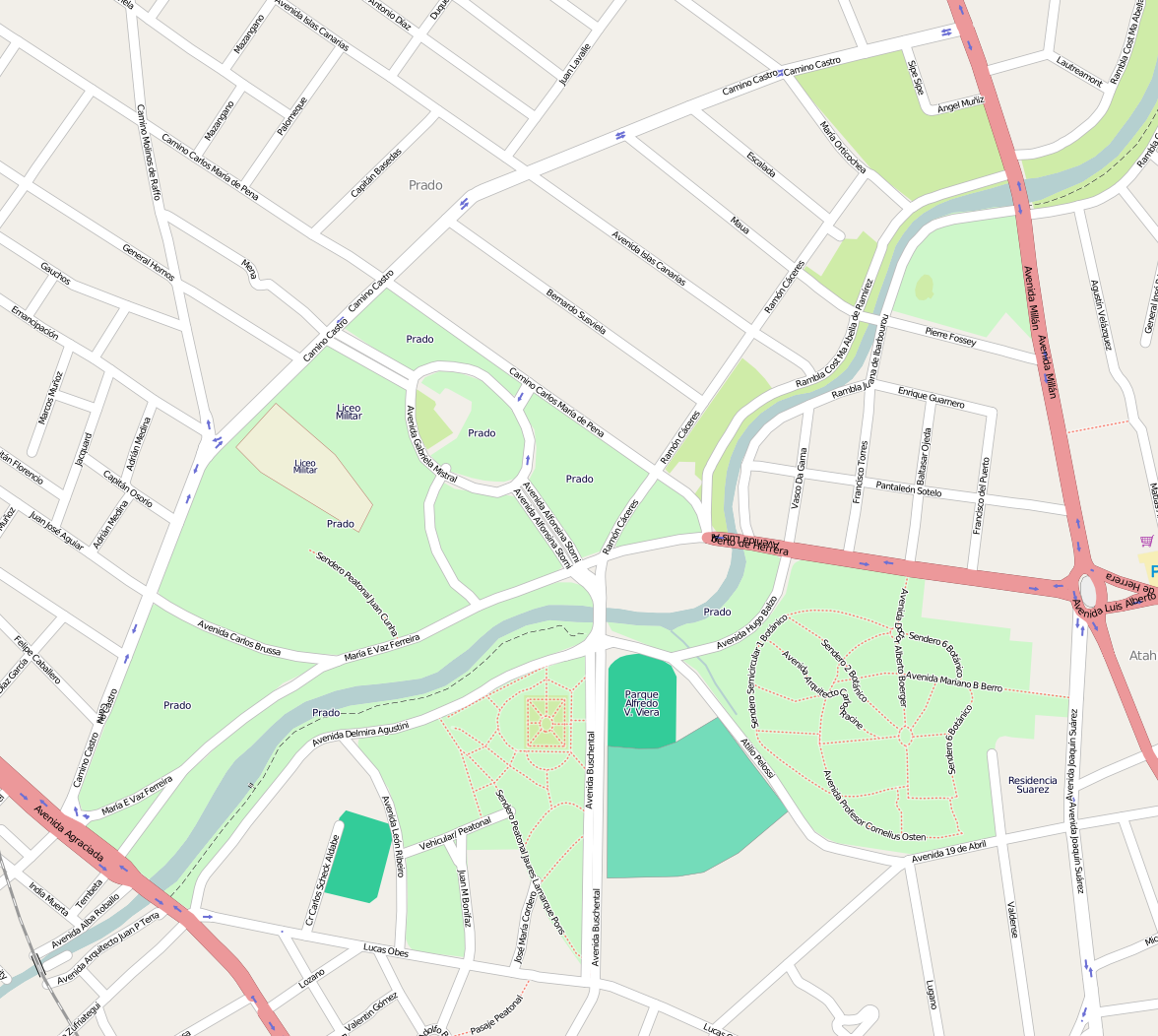
Map of Parque Prado

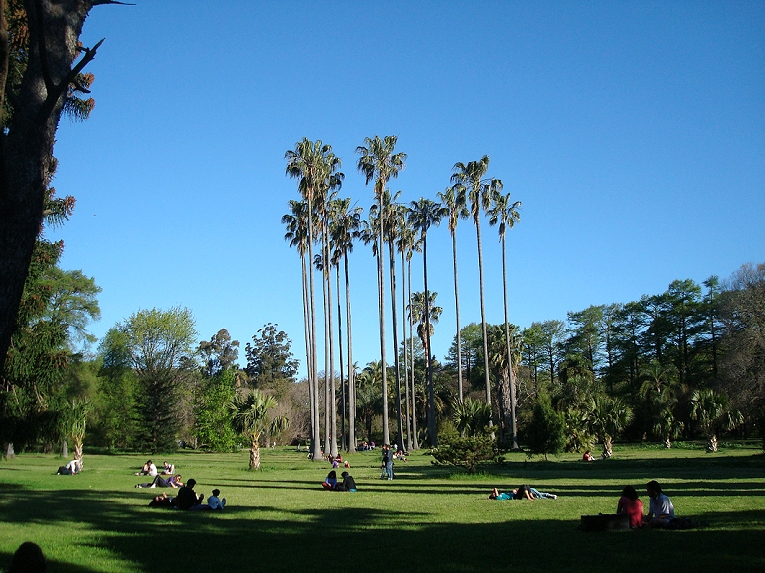

Parque Prado is the largest of Montevideo's six principal public parks. Established in 1873, it covers an area of 106 hectares and is located in the barrio of Prado. Located in the northern part of the city, the Miguelete Creek flows through the neighbourhood and park of the same name.

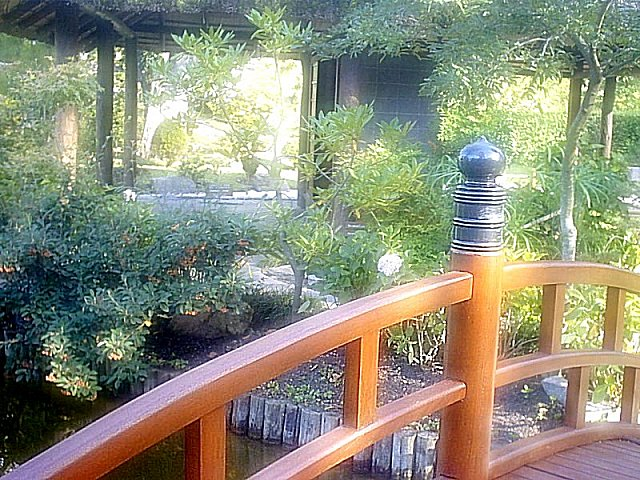
The Japanese gardens at the Blanes Museum.

The Presidential Residence is located behind the Botanical Gardens. Surrounded by the avenues Agraciada, Lucas Obes, Joaquín Suárez, Luis Alberto de Herrera and Castro streets, and José María Reyes is Rosedal, the rose garden. The garden contains four pergolas, eight domes, and a fountain, while the 12,000 roses were imported from France in 1910.

There are two museums in the Prado. Established in 1930, Juan Manuel Blanes Museum is situated in the Palladian villa, a National Historic Landmark since 1975 and includes a Japanese garden. The Professor Atilio Lombardo Museum and Botanical Gardens were established in 1902. The National Institute of Physical Climatology and its observatory are also in the Prado.

Across the Miguelete Creek from the Juan Manuel Blanes Museum, in the neighbourhood of Paso de las Duranas is a smaller park area which is called Prado Chico (Small Prado) and is considered as an extension of the Prado Park.
