= Flor de Maroñas =

- Barrio
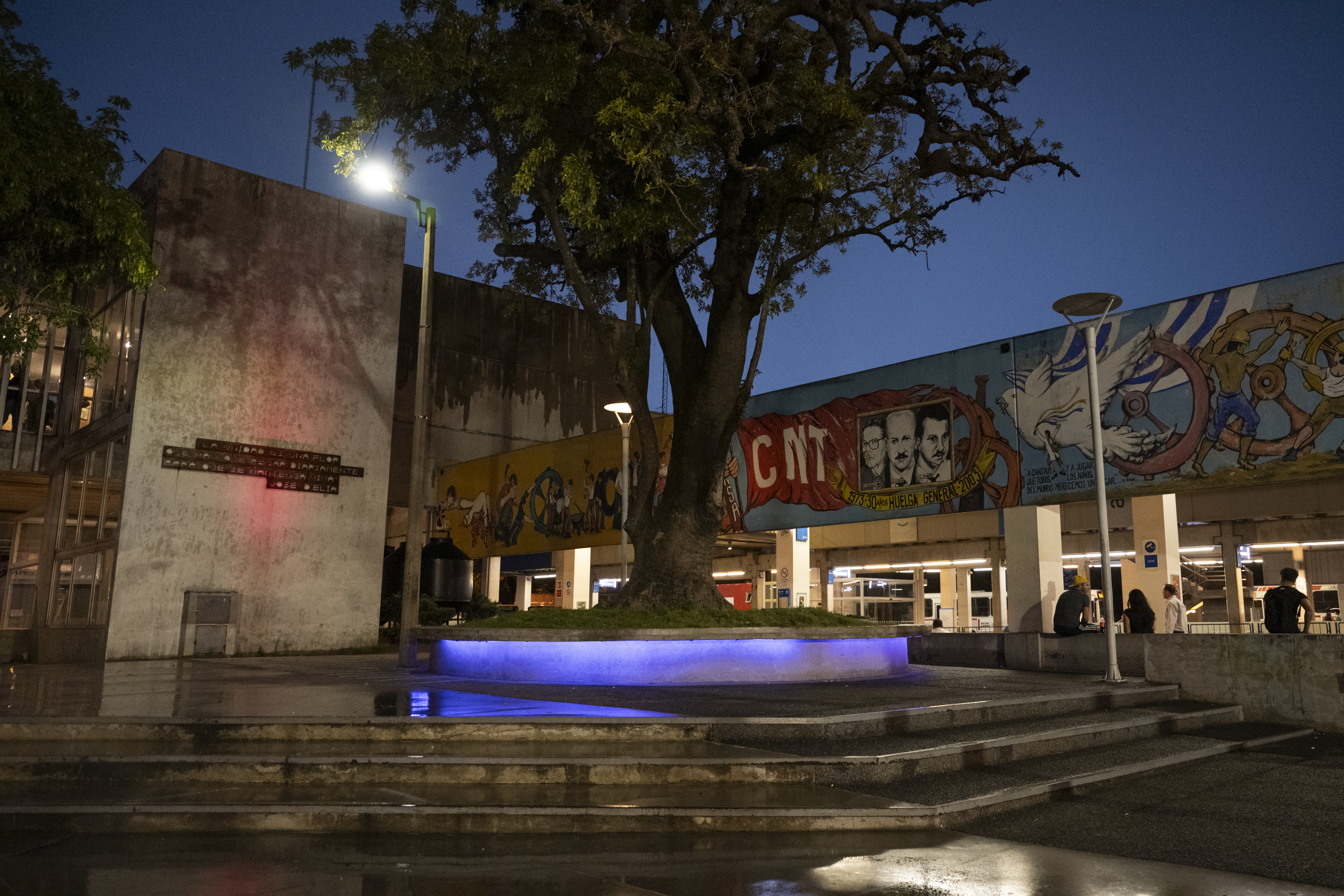

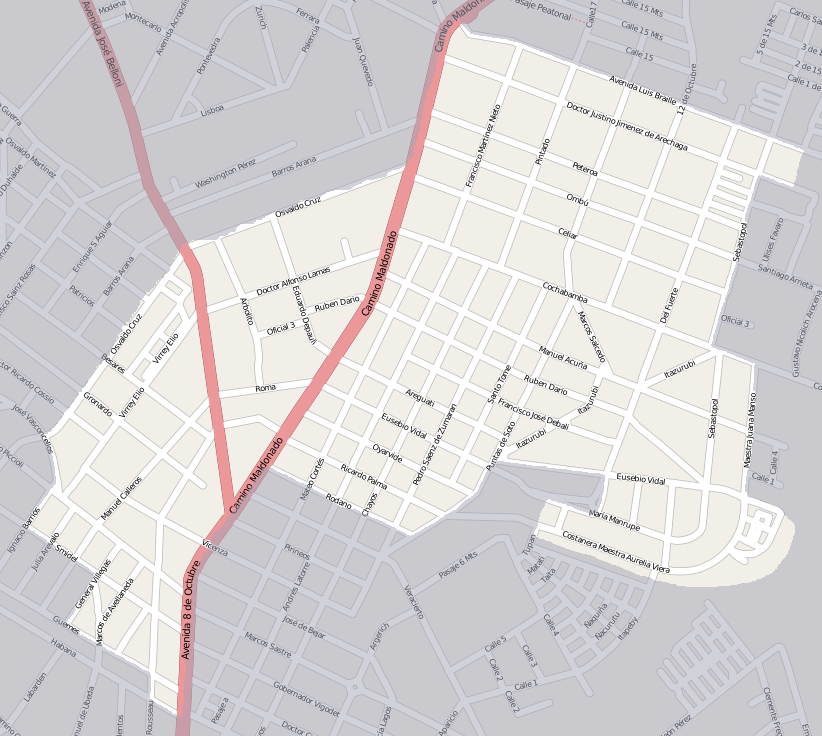
- Street map of Flor de Maroñas

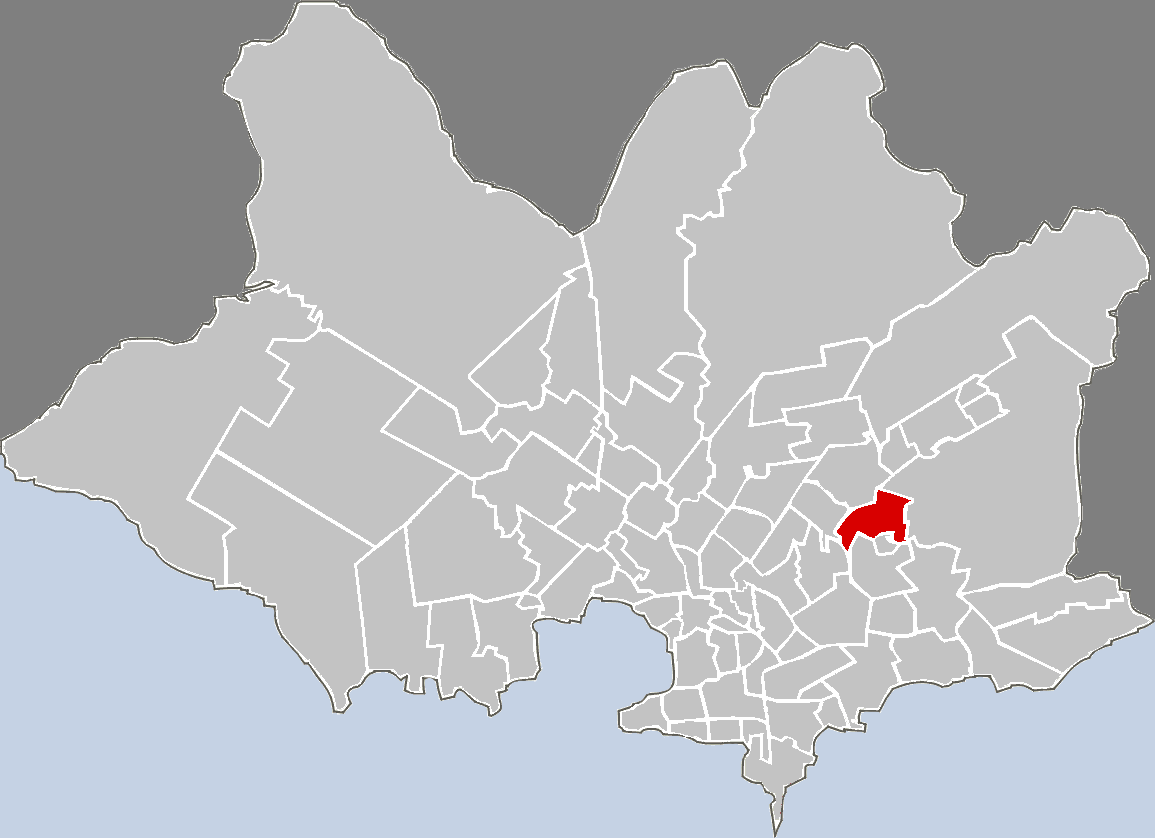
- Location of Flor de Maroñas in Montevideo
- Coordinates: 34°51′4″S 56°7′26″W
- Country: Uruguay
- Department: Montevideo Department
- City: Montevideo

Flor de Maroñas is a barrio (neighbourhood or district) of Montevideo, Uruguay.

== Location ==
It borders Villa Española to the southwest, Ituzaingó to the west, Jardines del Hipódromo to the north and northwest, Bañados de Carrasco to the east and northeast, Maroñas / Parque Guaraní to the south.

== Places of worship ==
- Parish Church of St Gemma Galgani (Roman Catholic)

== See also ==
- Barrios of Montevideo
