= Mume =

Mume or MUME may refer to:

- Multi-Users in Middle-earth, a free multiplayer role-playing game based upon J.R.R. Tolkien's Middle-earth

== Museums ==
- Exile Memorial Museum, a history museum in Catalonia, Spain
- Museo de la Memoria (Uruguay), a museum in Montevideo, Uruguay
- Regional Museum of Messina, a museum of Messina, Italy

== See also ==
- Prunus mume, a species of Asian plum
