= Prado, Montevideo =

Prado Prado — Nueva Savona
- Barrio
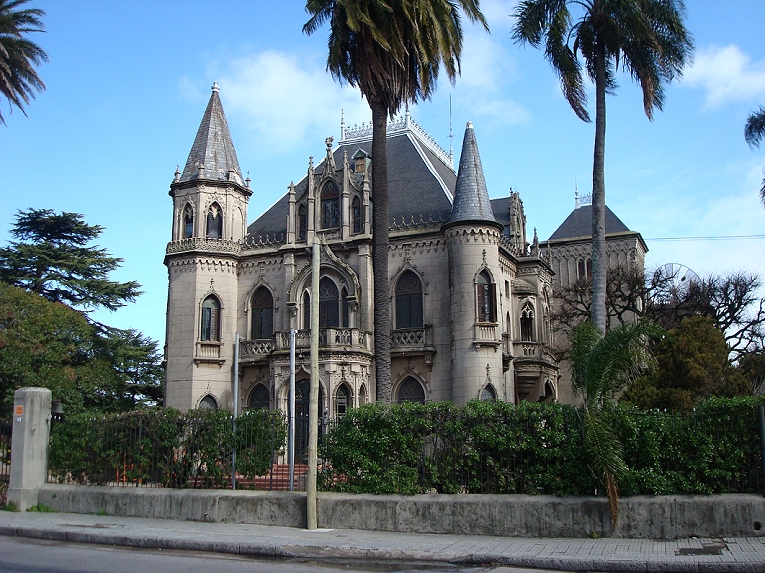
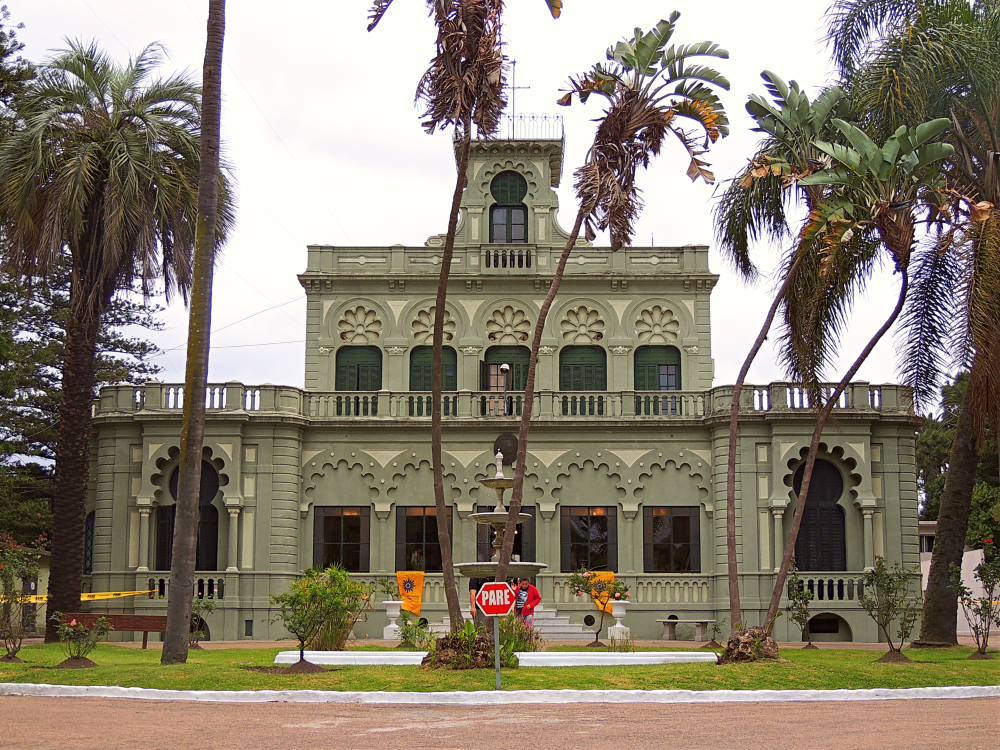
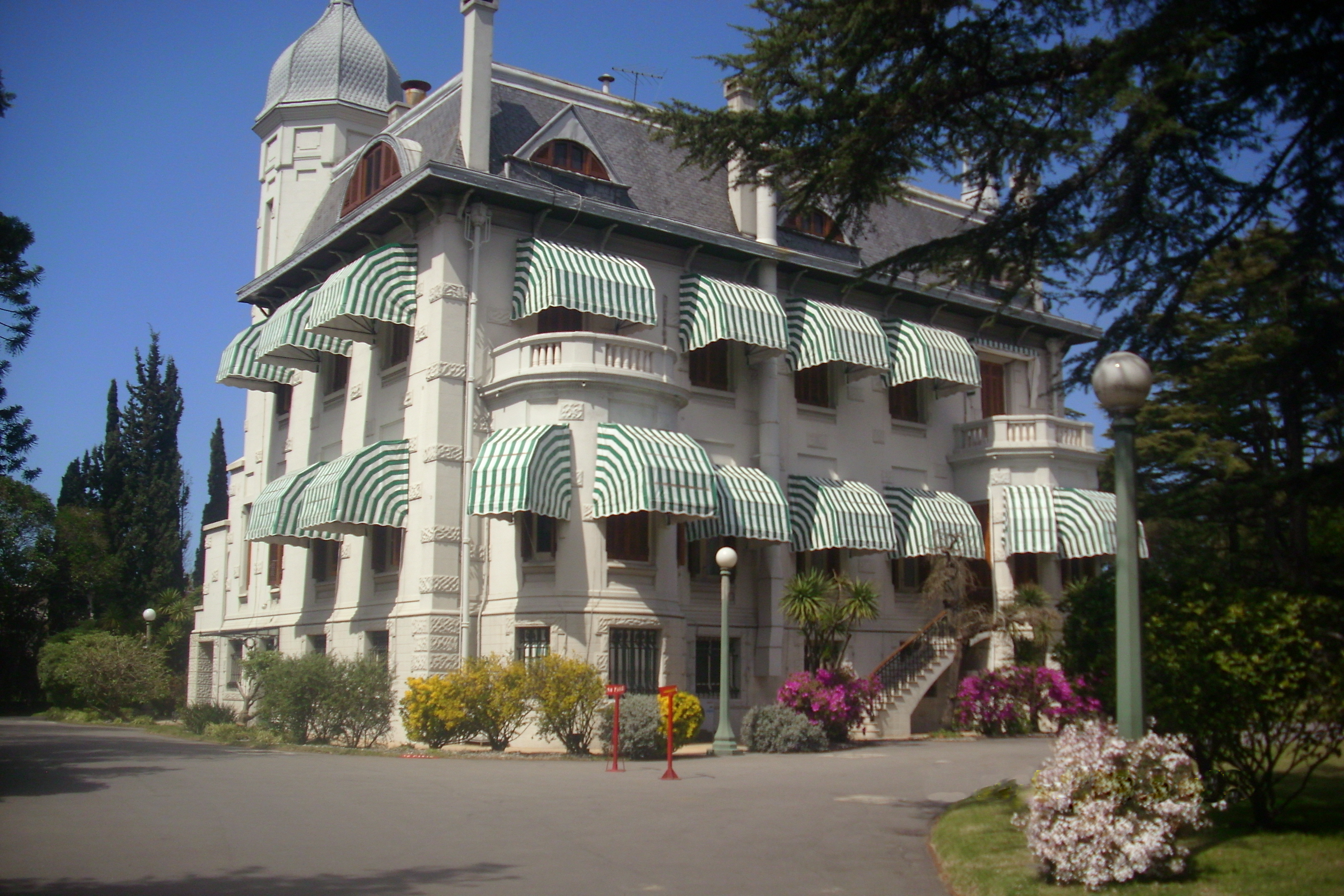
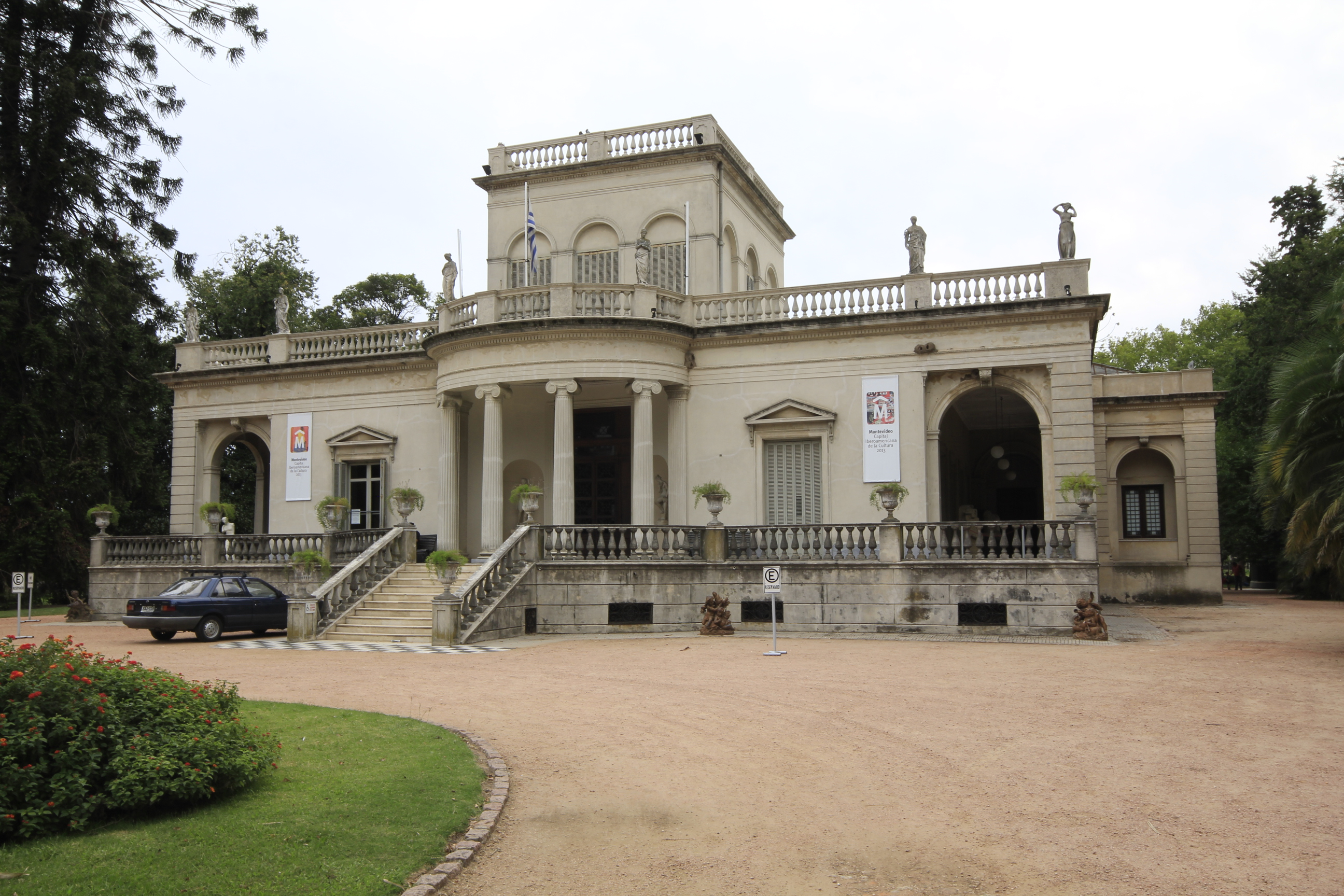
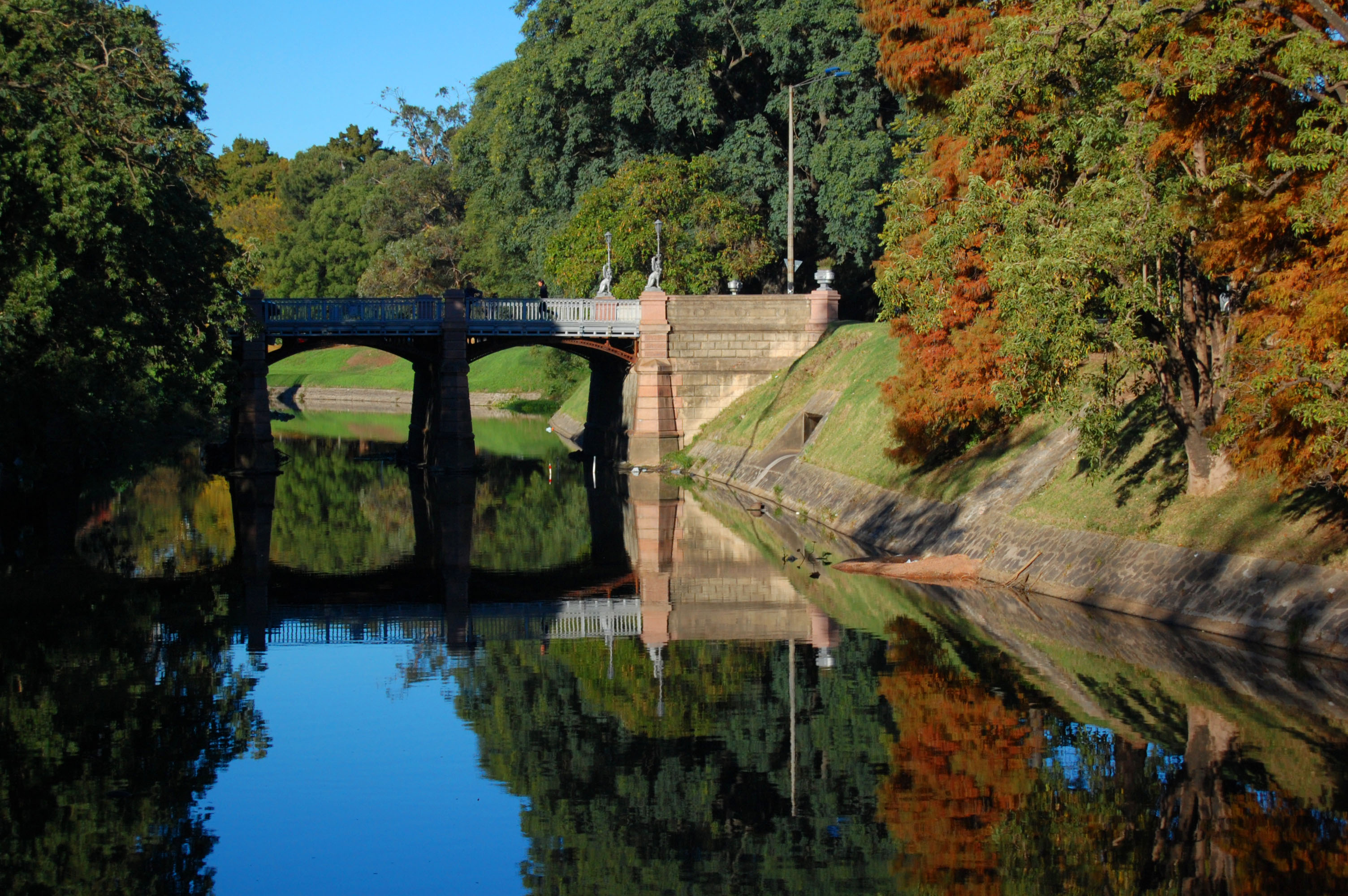
- Soneira Castle Eastman House Residencia de Suárez Blanes Museum Buschental Bridge

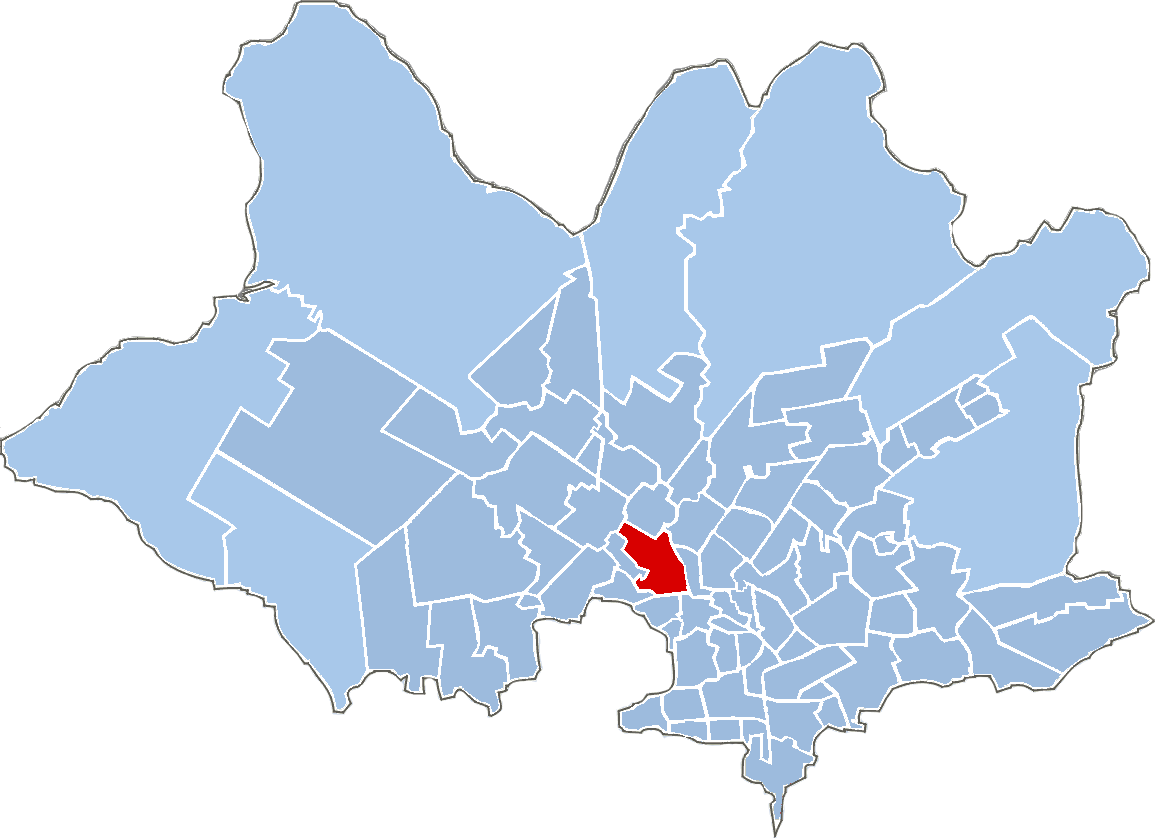
- Location of Prado in the Montevideo Department
- Coordinates: 34°54′13″S 56°11′18″W
- Country: Uruguay
- Department: Montevideo Department
- City: Montevideo

Prado is a barrio (neighbourhood or district) in Montevideo, Uruguay. Located in the central-western part of the city and crossed by the Miguelete Creek, it is a residential neighborhood known for its mansions and palatial homes built between the late 19th and early 20th centuries.

Administratively divided between Municipalities A and C of the Montevideo Department, its geographical center is the park from which it takes its name. It borders Capurro to the southwest, La Teja to the west, Belvedere to the northwest, Paso de las Duranas to the north, Aires Puros to the northeast and Atahualpa to the east and Bella Vista to the south.

== History ==
In the early 19th century, the area lay outside the walled city of Montevideo and was a fertile zone where land along the Miguelete Creek had been subdivided for agricultural use. Towards the 1840s, the farms that had been built began to be transformed into small houses with gardens, which were used by the besieging families during the Great Siege of Montevideo (1840–51). Following the end of the Uruguayan Civil War, the area saw the construction of its first country houses and became a summer retreat for the city’s upper class.

By the 1860s, the French-born businessman José de Buschental built the Buen Retiro Estate, which included a chalet and private park, where he installed the country's first steam-powered windmill. In 1893, the property was purchased by the Uruguayan state, which converted it into a public park. Starting in the 1890s, the area gradually evolved into the favored residential district of the city's upper class. Consequently, buildings became more elaborate, featuring grand houses and opulent mansions with landscaped gardens.

== The park ==
The park of Prado, known as Parque Prado is an important venue for the citizens of Montevideo. attractions are Rosedal, a rose garden, fountains, and monuments. Miguelete Creek flows through the park.

Part of the park is the "Rural del Prado", an exposition centre and fairgrounds.

== The barrio ==
The barrio is home to three soccer stadiums, José Nasazzi Park, Federico Saroldi Park, and Alfredo V. Viera Park where the Bella Vista Athletic Club, River Plate Athletic Club, and Montevideo Wanderers soccer teams, respectively, play their games.

The Prado barrio is home to the Carmelitas Church, the Castillo Soneira and many other beautiful old villas.

== Places of worship ==
This neighbourhood is full with Christian temples of very diverse denominations:

- Church of Our Lady of Mt. Carmel and St. Thérèse of Lisieux, popularly known as "Iglesia de los Carmelitas" (Roman Catholic, Carmelites)
- Church of St. Charles Borromeo and Our Lady of the Assumption (Roman Catholic)
- Church of the Immaculate Conception (Roman Catholic)
- Armenian Catholic Cathedral of Our Lady of Bzommar (Armenian Catholic)
- St. Nicholas Greek Orthodox Church (Greek Orthodox)
- St. Paul Lutheran Church (Lutheran)

== See also ==
- Barrios of Montevideo

== Images ==
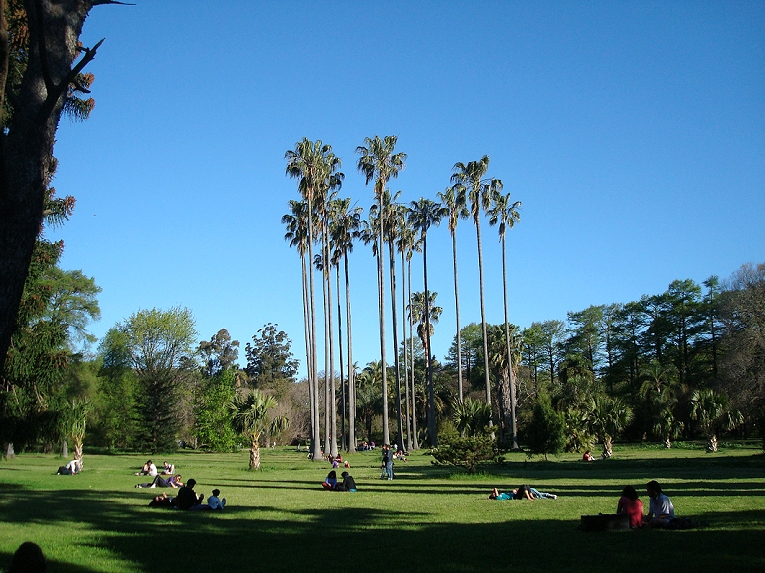
The Botanic Garden in Prado Park
