= Capilla San José de Manga, Montevideo =

Roman Catholic chapel in Montevideo, Uruguay

Capilla San José de Manga
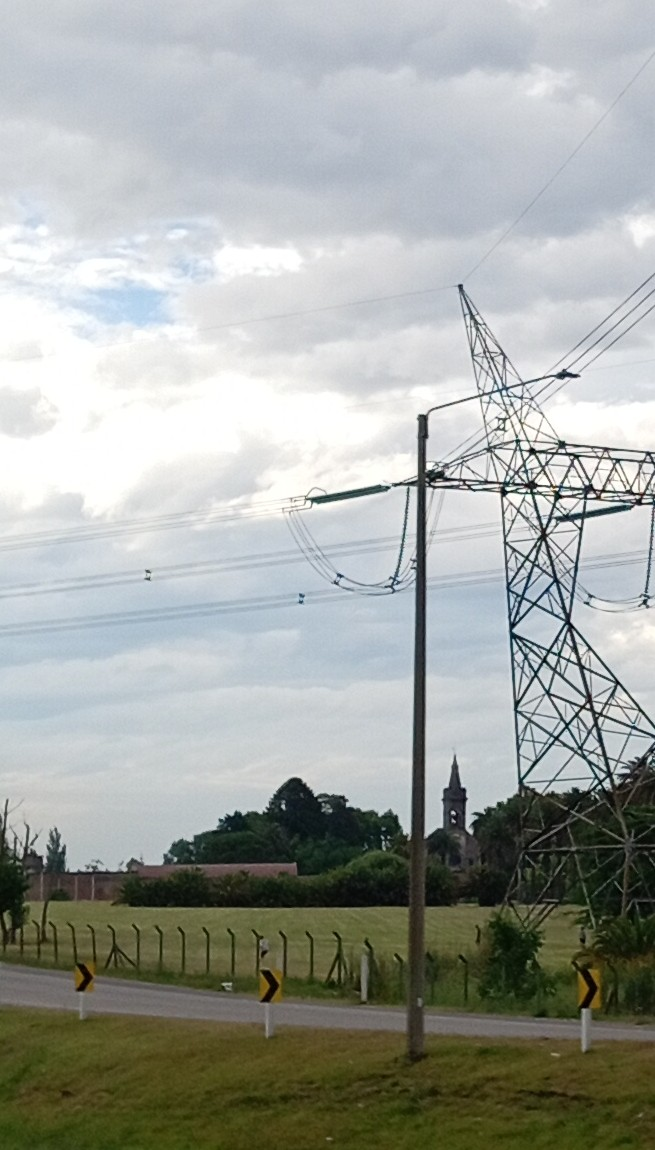

Religion
- Affiliation: Roman Catholic
- Ecclesiastical or organisational status: Chapel

Location
- Location: Jacksonville; Montevideo, Uruguay
- Interactive map of Capilla San José de Manga
- Coordinates: 34°47′21″S 56°04′41″W

Architecture
- Architect: Ernesto Vespignani
- Type: Church

The Saint Joseph of Manga Chapel (Spanish: Capilla San José de Manga) is a Roman Catholic chapel near the suburban neighbourhood of Villa García, Montevideo, Uruguay.

Originally it was part of the Jackson Agricultural School (established by Juan D. Jackson) and Salesian Educational School. Built by Ernesto Vespignani, it is dedicated to Saint Joseph. Nowadays it is an important wedding venue, inside the Jacksonville Development. Due to this reason, this church is socially known as Capilla Jacksonville.
