= Greece–Uruguay relations =

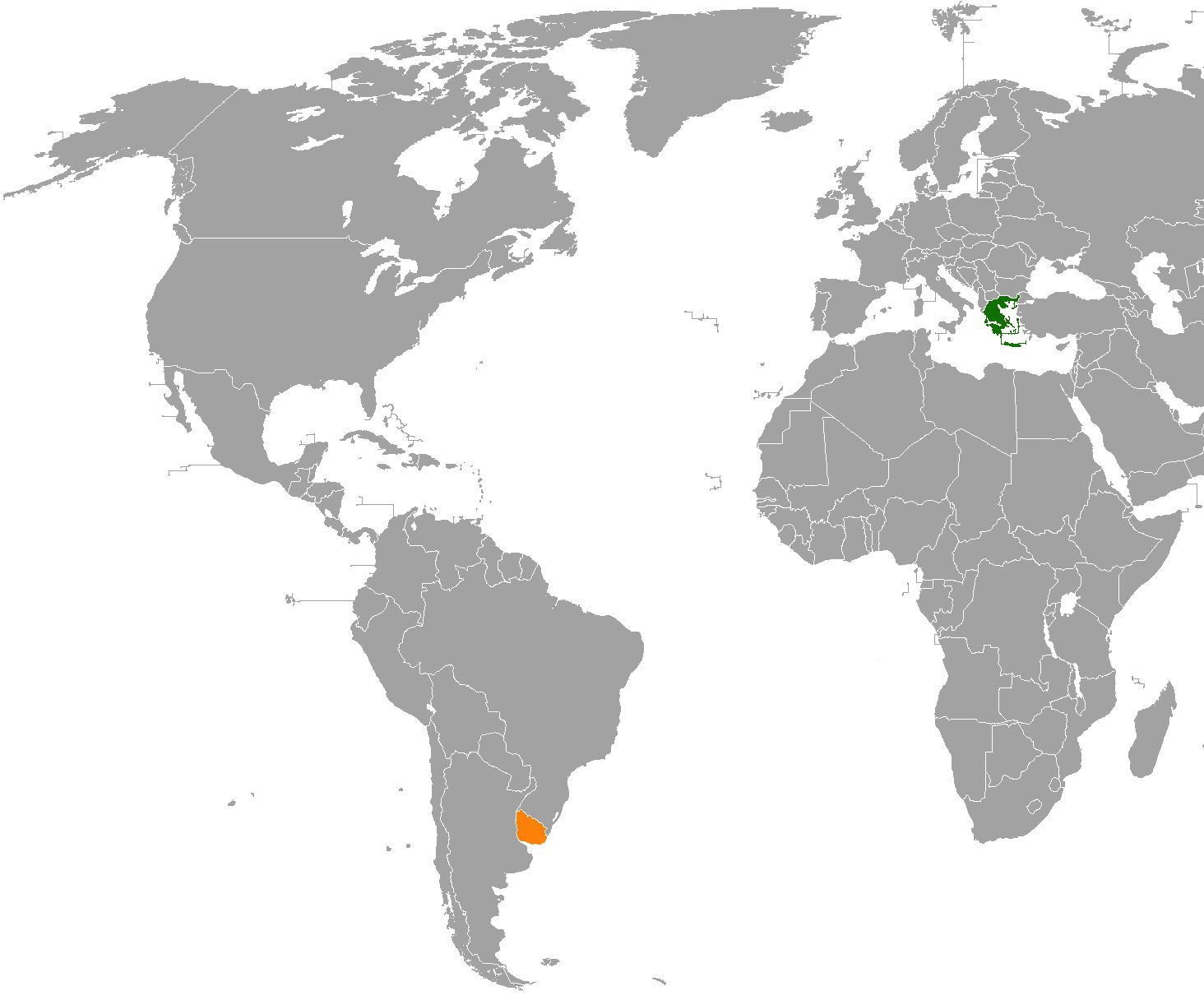
- Greece: Uruguay

Greece–Uruguay relations are diplomatic relations between Greece and Uruguay. Both nations are members of the World Trade Organization.

== History ==
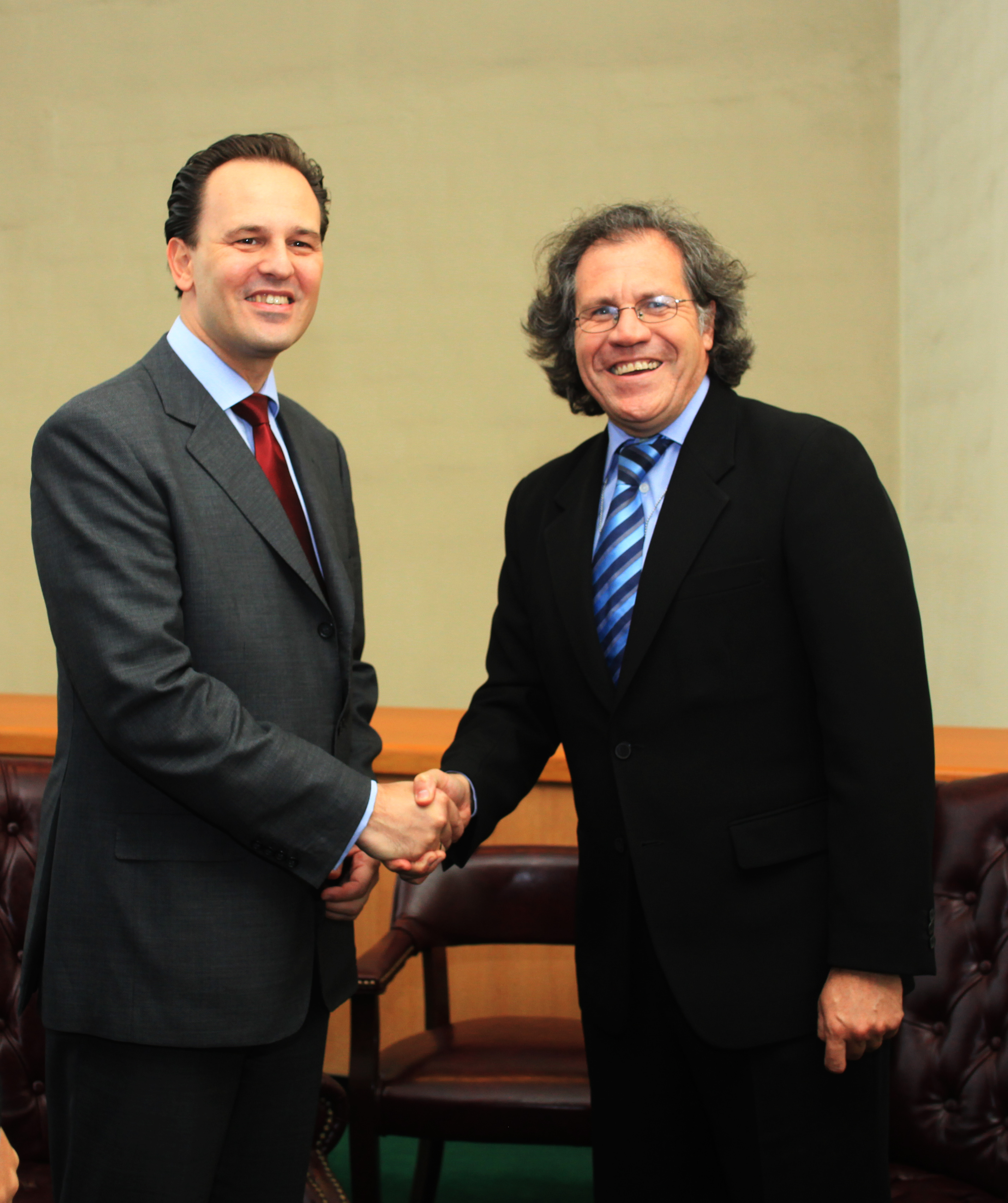
Greek and Uruguayan Foreign Ministers Dimitrios Droutsas and Luis Almagro meeting in New York City, 2010.

Uruguay was one of the first countries to recognize the newly established Greek state after the war of independence from the Ottoman Empire in 1821. In 1872, Greece and Uruguay established honorary consulates in each other's countries. In 1916, the La Colectividad Helénica de Montevideo was established in Montevideo as a cultural center for the Greek community in Uruguay. In the 1920s, the first major wave of Greek immigrants arrived in the country. Diplomatic relations between Greece and Uruguay were officially established in 1928. In the 1950s and 1960s, after the Greek Civil War, Uruguay received a second wave of Greek immigrants to the country.

In March 1978, the Maria Tsakos Foundation was established in Montevideo to teach ancient and modern Hellenic culture and language.

In late April 2024, Greek President Katerina Sakellaropoulou made an official visit to Uruguay, the first Greek head of state to do so. She met with Uruguayan President Luis Lacalle Pou at Residencia de Suárez, signing a cooperation agreement on maritime affairs with him. She also met with Vice President Beatriz Argimón during her visit to the Legislative Palace in Montevideo. Likewise, Sakellaropoulou visited the headquarters of the Greek community of Uruguay and different cultural sites in the country, such as the Solís Theatre.

== Bilateral agreements ==
Both nations have signed several bilateral agreements, such as an Agreement on Cultural Cooperation (1967); Agreement on Social Security (1994), an Agreement on the Reciprocal Abolition of Visas for Diplomatic and Service Passport Holders (1994), and an Agreement on Cooperation in Maritime Affairs.

== Trade ==
Greece's main exports to Uruguay include: Papadopoulos biscuits, olive oil and tobacco. Uruguay's main exports to Greece include: soy, citruses (primarily lemons) and fish. Greek shipping company, Tsakos Energy Navigation, is a major investor in Uruguay with more than US$250 million invested in the country.

== Resident diplomatic missions ==
- Greece has an embassy in Montevideo.
- Uruguay has an embassy in Athens.

== See also ==
- Greek Uruguayans
- Saint Nicholas Greek Orthodox Church, Montevideo
