= Atahualpa, Montevideo =

Atahualpa
- Barrio
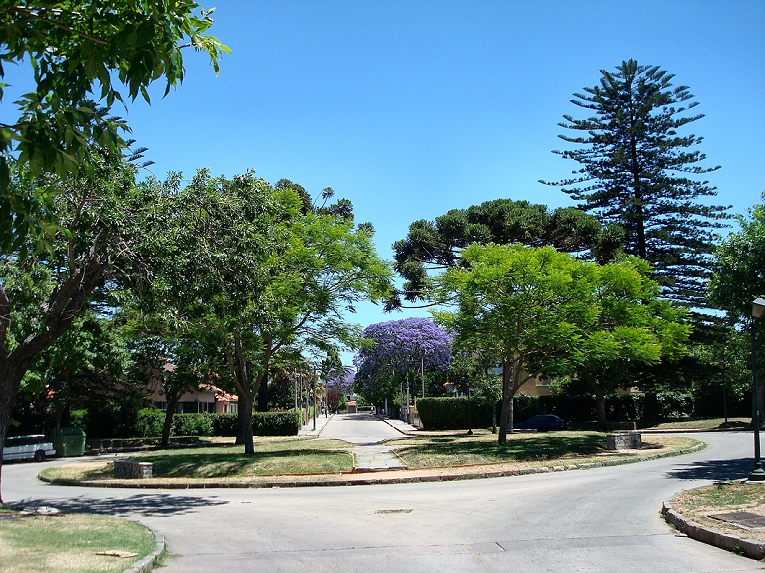
- Plaza Atahualpa

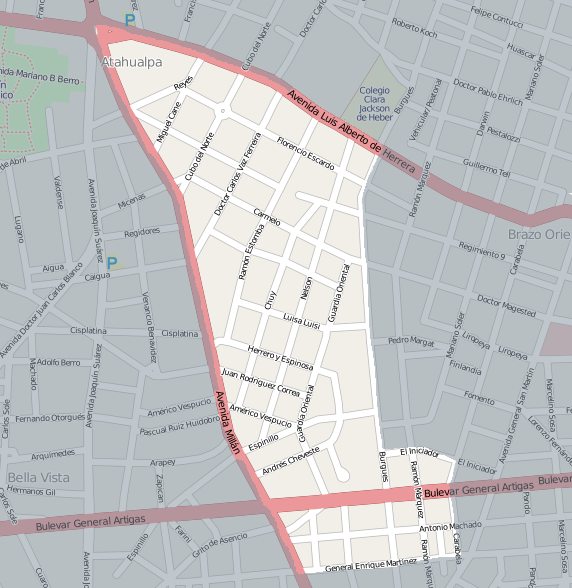
- Street map of Atahualpa

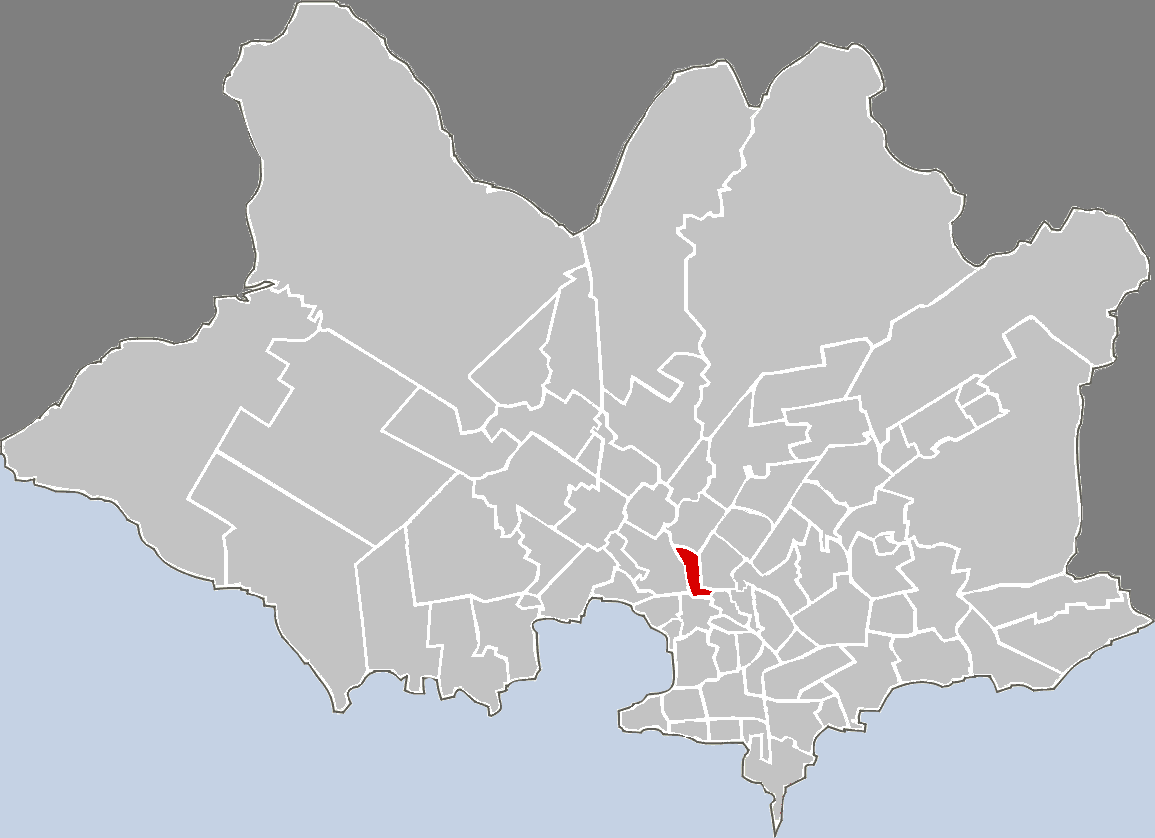
- Map of Montevideo highlighting the barrio
- Coordinates: 34°51′53″S 56°11′23″W
- Country: Uruguay
- Department: Montevideo Department
- City: Montevideo
- Website: http://www.barrioatahualpa.com/mapa.php

Atahualpa is a barrio (neighbourhood or district) of Montevideo, Uruguay. It borders with Prado to the west, Aires Puros to the north, Brazo Oriental to the east and Reducto to the south.

Politically located in Municipality C of Montevideo, it is a residential neighborhood, with large stately mansions and gardens, closely linked to the Prado neighborhood. It was named after the last independent Inca emperor.

== History ==
The neighborhood emerged on August 16, 1868, when the Sociedad Anónima de Fomento Montevideano founded the Pueblo Atahualpa (Spanish for 'Atahualpa Town'), celebrating the occasion with the launch of a hot air balloon with national symbols. Previously, the area was outside the walled city and was used for agriculture due to its proximity to the banks of the Miguelete Creek.

In the years following its foundation, wide tree-lined avenues and large houses with gardens were built in the neighborhood, having the same development as the Prado neighborhood. In addition, a tram line that connected the area with the central business district was built.

== Landmarks ==
Different National Historical Monuments are erected in Atahualpa, such as the neo-Gothic Church of the Sagrada Familia –built by the Jackson-Errazquín family as a private chapel in their residence–, and the Casa Quinta Vaz Ferreira –a Victorian-style residence, which served as the home of the lawyer, philosopher and writer Carlos Vaz Ferreira–.

== See also ==
- Barrios of Montevideo
