= Villa García =

Villa García–Manga Rural
- Barrio
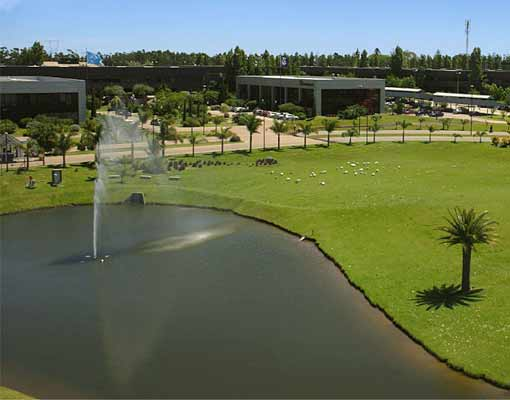

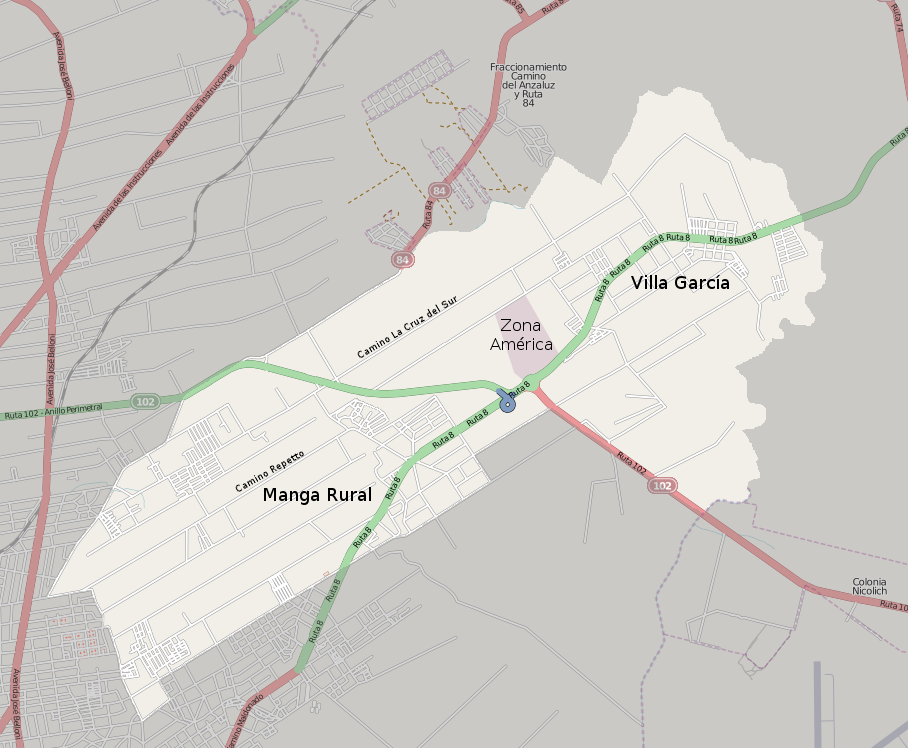
- Street map of Villa García–Manga Rural

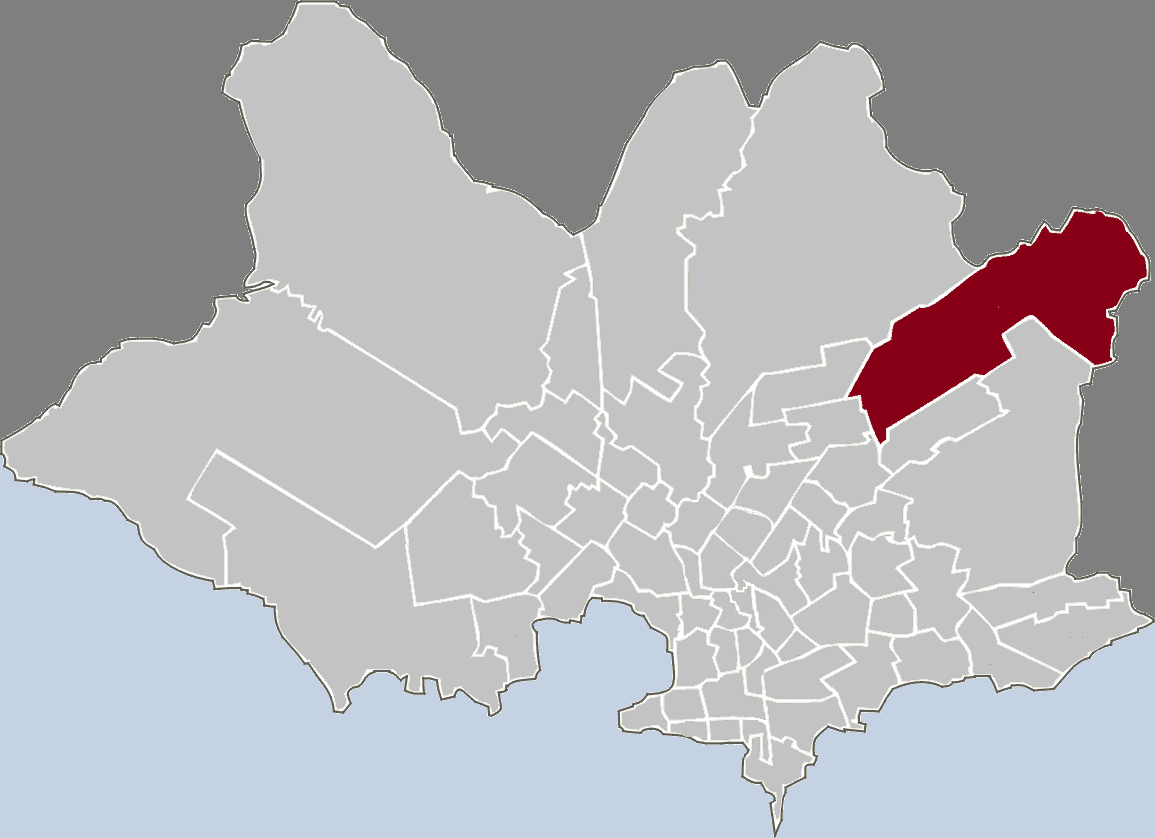
- Location of Villa García–Manga Rural in Montevideo
- Coordinates: 34°47′S 56°03′W
- Country: Uruguay
- Department: Montevideo Department
- City: Montevideo

Villa García–Manga Rural is a barrio (neighbourhood or district) of Montevideo, Uruguay.

Formerly there was an important agricultural school here, established by Juan D. Jackson. Nowadays it has been transformed in the Jacksonville development.

== Places of worship ==
- Christ of Toledo Parish Church, Ruta 8 Nº 9303 (Roman Catholic)
- St. Joseph of Manga Chapel, in Jacksonville (Roman Catholic)
- Parish Church of St. Lawrence, Cno. Repetto 3937 (Roman Catholic, Salesian Sisters of Don Bosco)

== See also ==
- Barrios of Montevideo
