= Sagrada Familia, Montevideo =

Roman Catholic parish church in Aires Puros, Montevideo, Uruguay

Coordinates: 34°51′32.1″S 56°11′22.4″W

Sagrada Familia (Capilla Jackson)
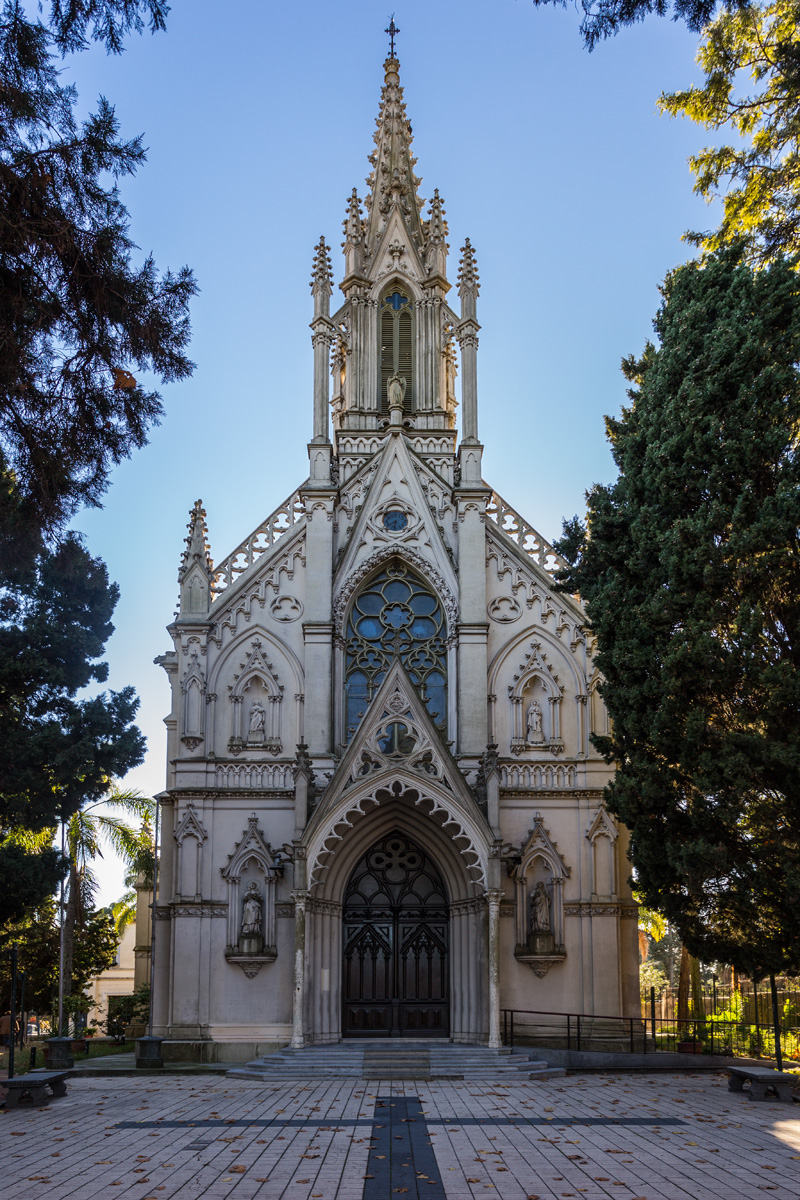

Religion
- Affiliation: Roman Catholic
- Ecclesiastical or organizational status: Parish church
- Year consecrated: 1870

Location
- Location: Carlos Vaz Ferreira 3711; Montevideo, Uruguay
- Interactive map of Sagrada Familia (Capilla Jackson)

Architecture
- Architect: Víctor Rabú
- Type: Church
- Style: Neo-Gothic
- Completed: 1870

The Church of the Holy Family (Spanish: Iglesia de la Sagrada Familia), also known as Capilla Jackson, is a Roman Catholic parish church in the neighbourhood of Aires Puros, Montevideo, Uruguay.

== History ==
The temple was built as a private chapel for the Jackson family; designed by French architect Víctor Rabú in Neo-Gothic style, it was the edifice religious was built and consecrated in the year 1870. Currently it is a parish church held by the Jesuits.

The parish was established on 16 April 1961. In 1975 it was declared a National Historical Monument.

The remains of businessman Juan D. Jackson are buried here.
