= Santa Gema Galgani, Montevideo =

Saint Gemma Galgani
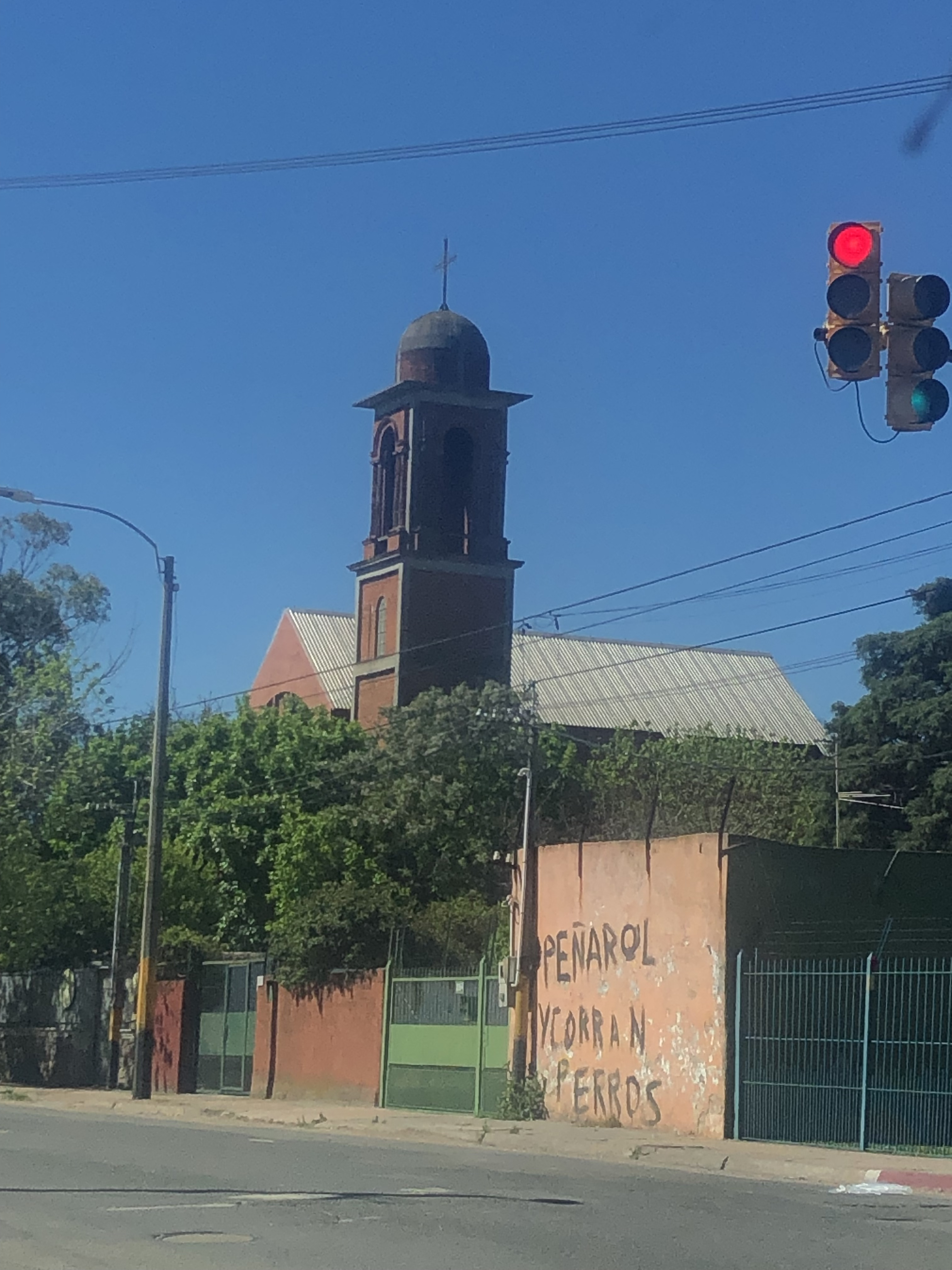
- Saint Gemma Galgani
- Location: Flor de Maroñas, Montevideo
- Address: José Belloni Avenue
- Denomination: Roman Catholic

History
- Dedication: Gemma Galgani
- Dedicated: 1965

The Church of Saint Gemma Galgani (Spanish: Iglesia de Santa Gema Galgani) is a Roman Catholic parish church in the neighbourhood of Flor de Maroñas, Montevideo, Uruguay.

The parish was established on 15 May 1965. Held by the Passionists, the temple is dedicated to saint Gemma Galgani, a former lay member of the Order.

The temple also hosts concerts by the Montevideo Symphony Orchestra.
