= Iglesia Evangélica Armenia, Montevideo =

Church in Montevideo, Uruguay

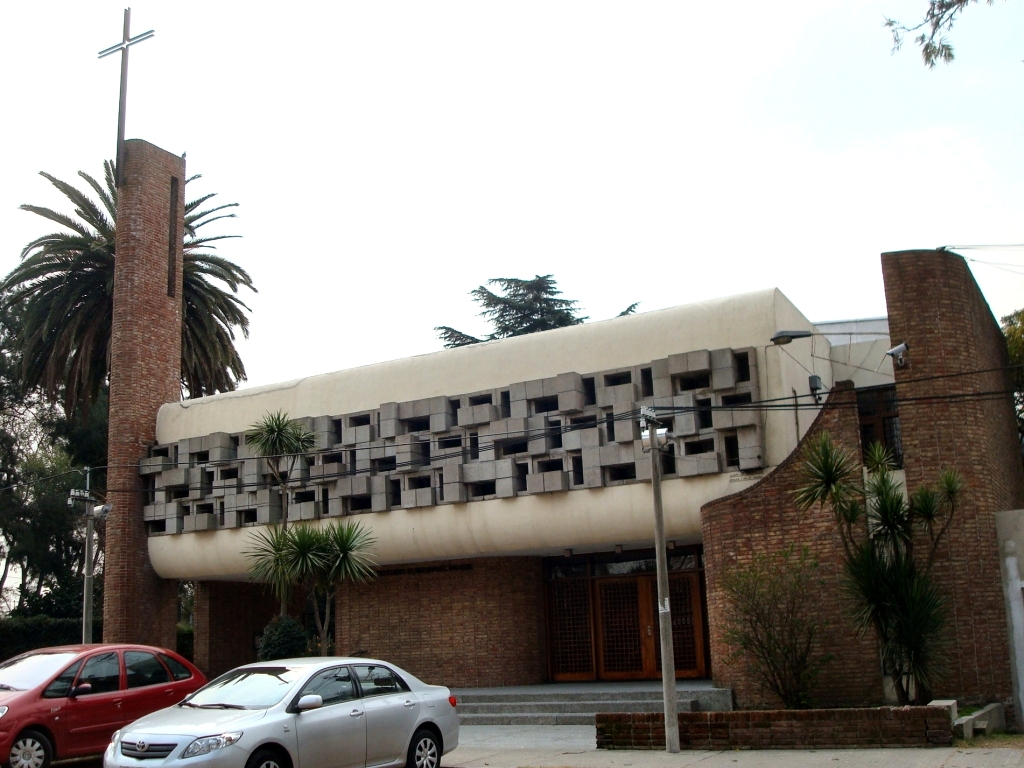
Armenian Evangelical Church

The Armenian Evangelical Church (Spanish: Iglesia Evangélica Armenia, Armenian: Հայաստանեայց Աւետարանական Եկեղեցի) is an Armenian Evangelical temple in the neighbourhood of Brazo Oriental, Montevideo. It constitutes the headquarters of this Church for Uruguay, the institution being a member of the Federation of the Evangelical Churches of Uruguay (established in 1956), which is affiliated with the Commission on World Mission and Evangelism of the World Council of Churches.
