= Cristo de Toledo, Montevideo =

Christ of Toledo
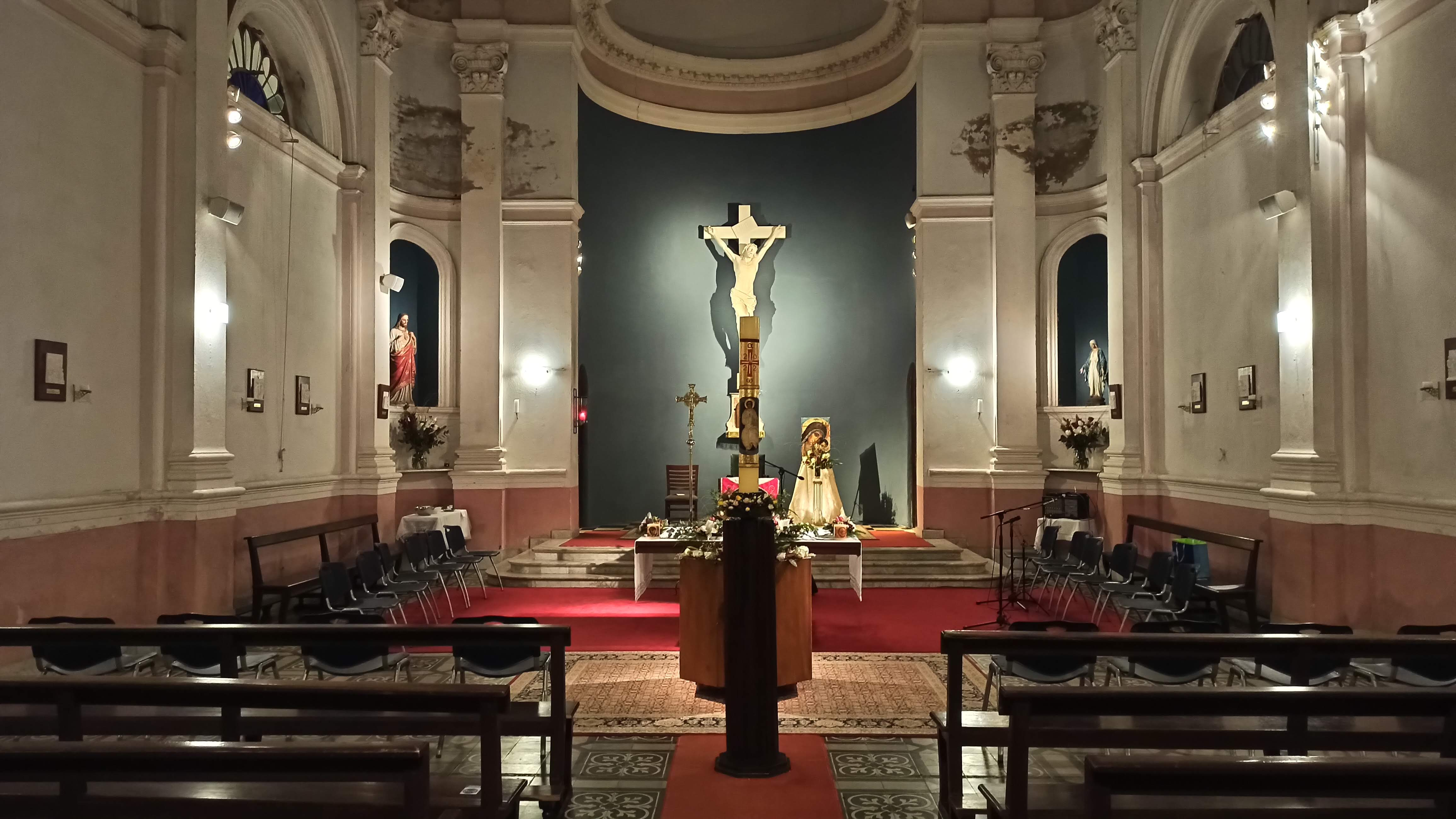
- Christ of Toledo
- Location: Villa García, Montevideo
- Address: Route 8
- Country: Uruguay
- Denomination: Roman Catholic

History
- Dedication: Christ of Toledo

Architecture
- Functional status: Parish
- Architectural type: Eclecticism

Administration
- Archdiocese: Roman Catholic Archdiocese of Montevideo

The Christ of Toledo Parish Church (Spanish: Parroquia Cristo de Toledo) is a Roman Catholic parish church located in the suburban neighbourhood of Villa García, Montevideo, Uruguay.

== History ==
Doroteo Garcia, an owner of wide tracts of land in Villa García, died in 1885. His widow Carolina Lagos decided to build this church as a memorial to her husband. It was built in a historically eclectic style, with a neoclassic facade. Its architect is unknown. It was erected on a hill that can be seen from far away, and was consecrated in 1891. Inside, there is a Carrara marble sculpture of Christ by the sculptor Romairone.

The parish was established on 30 October 1919. The Salesians of Don Bosco now run an oratory devoted to children in a situation of social risk.
