= Saint Nicholas Greek Orthodox Church, Montevideo =

Greek Orthodox Church in Montevideo, Uruguay

Coordinates: 34°52′3.7″S 56°12′13.2″W

Iglesia Ortodoxa Griega
- San Nicolás
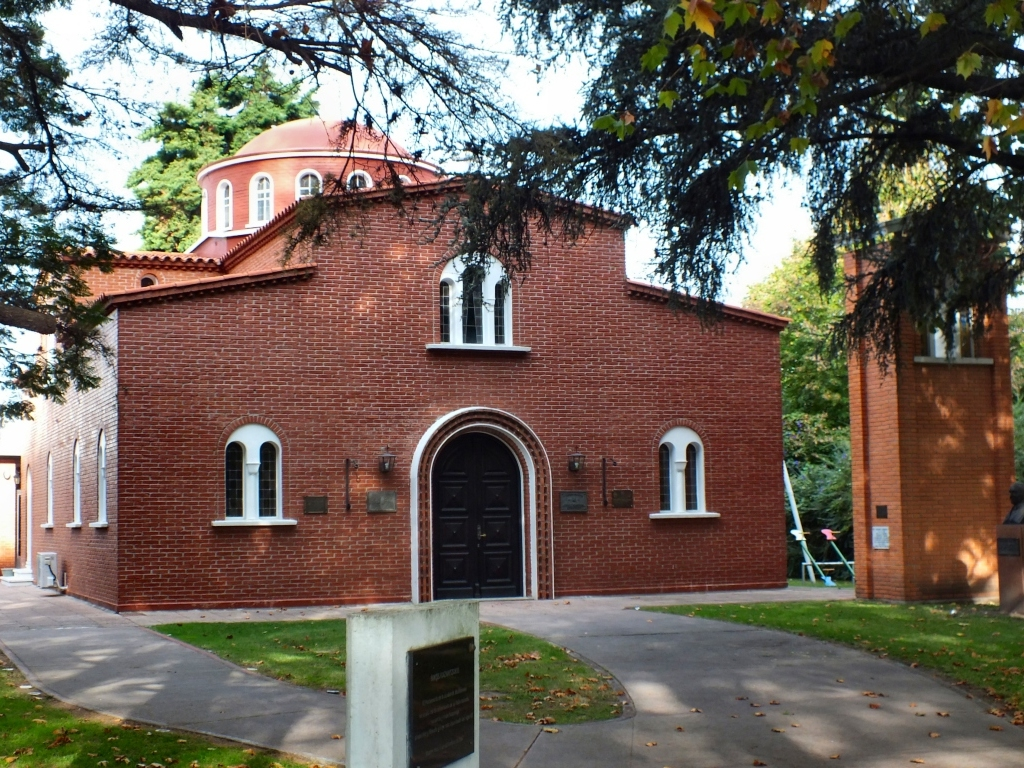

Religion
- Affiliation: Greek Orthodox Church

Location
- Location: Av. 19 de Abril 3366; Montevideo, Uruguay
- Interactive map of Iglesia Ortodoxa Griega

The Saint Nicholas Greek Orthodox Church (Spanish: Iglesia Ortodoxa Griega San Nicolás) is an Eastern Orthodox church building located in the grounds of the headquarters of the Greek Community in Prado neighbourhood in Montevideo, Uruguay.

This church is a social and religious meeting point for the Greek Uruguayan community. It is part of the Greek Orthodox Archdiocese of Buenos Aires and South America.

== See also ==
- Greek Orthodox Church
- Greeks in Uruguay
