= Brazo Oriental =

- Barrio
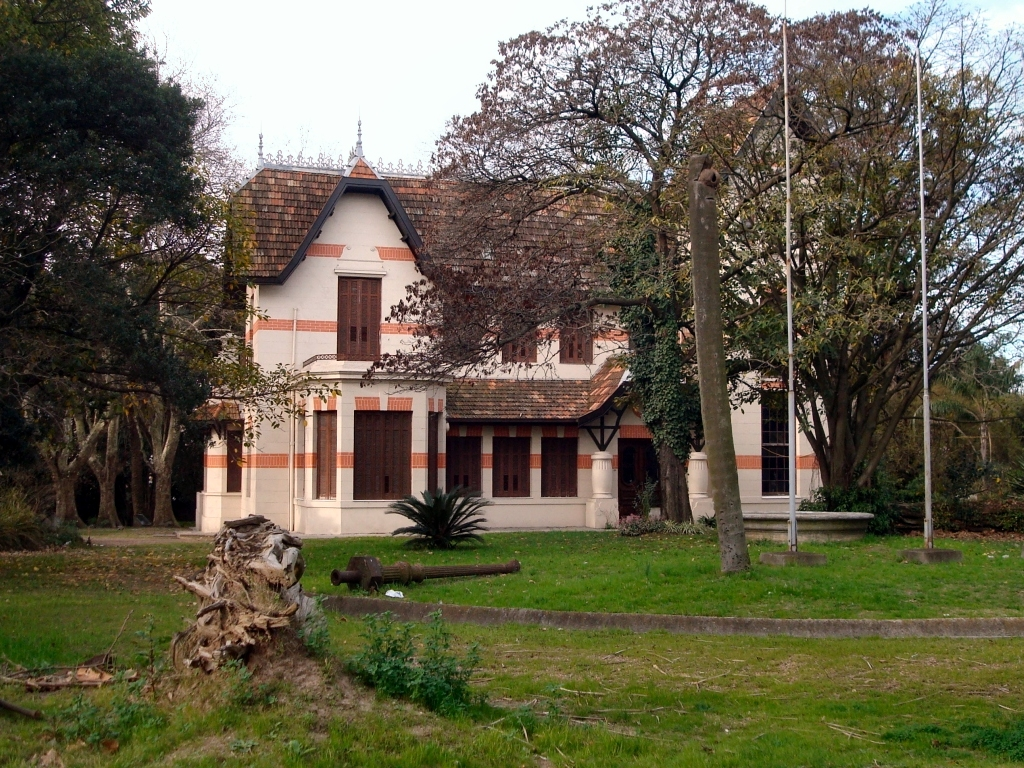
- The historical residence of Dr. Luís Alberto de Herrera

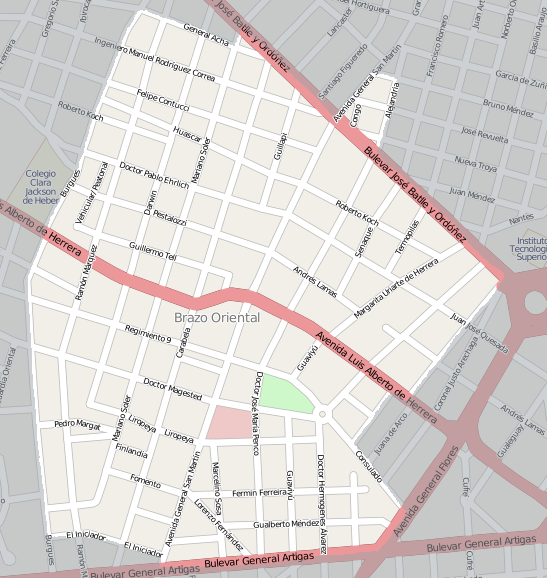
- Street map of Brazo Oriental

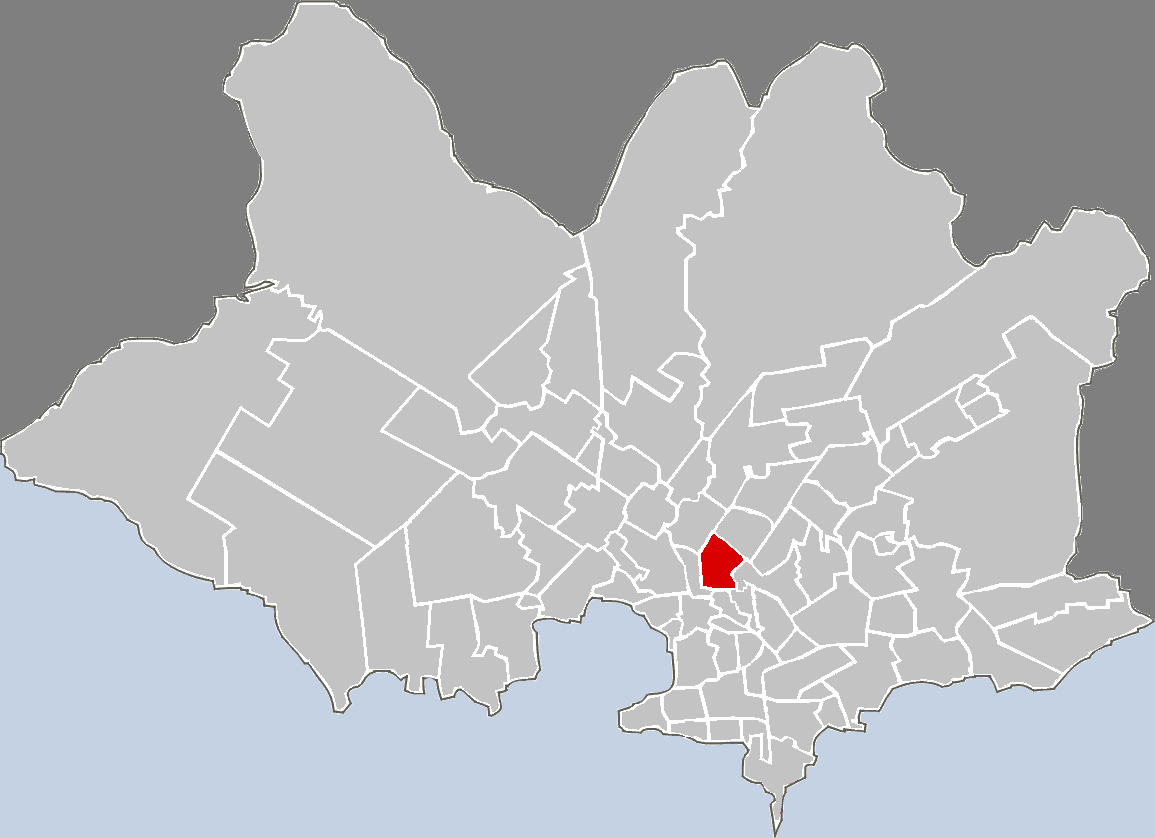
- Map of Montevideo highlighting the barrio
- Coordinates: 34°51′54″S 56°10′43″W
- Country: Uruguay
- Department: Montevideo Department
- City: Montevideo

Brazo Oriental is a barrio (neighbourhood or district) of Montevideo, the capital of Uruguay. Brazo Oriental is a residential zone located approximately 5 kilometres (3.1 mi) from Montevideo's centre.

== Location and origin of name ==
Brazo Oriental borders La Figurita and Jacinto Vera to the south, Bolívar to the east, Cerrito de la Victoria to the northeast, Aires Puros to the northwest and Atahualpa to the west. It is delimited by Artigas Boulevard to the south, Burgues Avenue to the west and José Batlle y Ordóñez Boulevard to the north.

It was reported in the press around 1910 that there had been a mortal fight with knives between a "Porteño" (Argentinian) and an "Oriental" (Uruguayan) at the corner of the actual avenues San Martín and Luis Alberto de Herrera. Although the Argentinian was younger and more agile, the fight was won by the Uruguayan thanks to the power of his arm (brazo). For many years following the event this place was called "la esquina del brazo del Oriental" (the corner of the arm of the Oriental), which finally gave its name to the barrio.

== Landmarks ==
The most important landmarks of the barrio are the Museo de la Casa de Luis Alberto de Herrera, historical leader of the Partido Nacional, the Escuela Superior de Comercio of the Universidad del Trabajo del Uruguay (UTU) the headquarters of the Colón F.C. sports club and the public sports facilities of "Plaza de deportes 12", which include a closed gymnasium, a 25-meter open air swimming pool, two basket courts and a 100m sprinting stripe.

== Places of worship ==
- Armenian Evangelical Church (Armenian Evangelical)

== Transportation ==
The bus lines that pass through Brazo Oriental are the following: 76, 185, 186, 526 (Artigas Boulevard); 155, 156, 396, 404, 456 (San Martín avenue); 150, 158 (Burgues avenue); 169, 175, 199, 505 (General Flores avenue); 181, 182, 183, 306 (Luis Alberto de Herrera avenue); 2, 173 (José Batlle y Ordóñez Boulevard).

== Historical maps ==
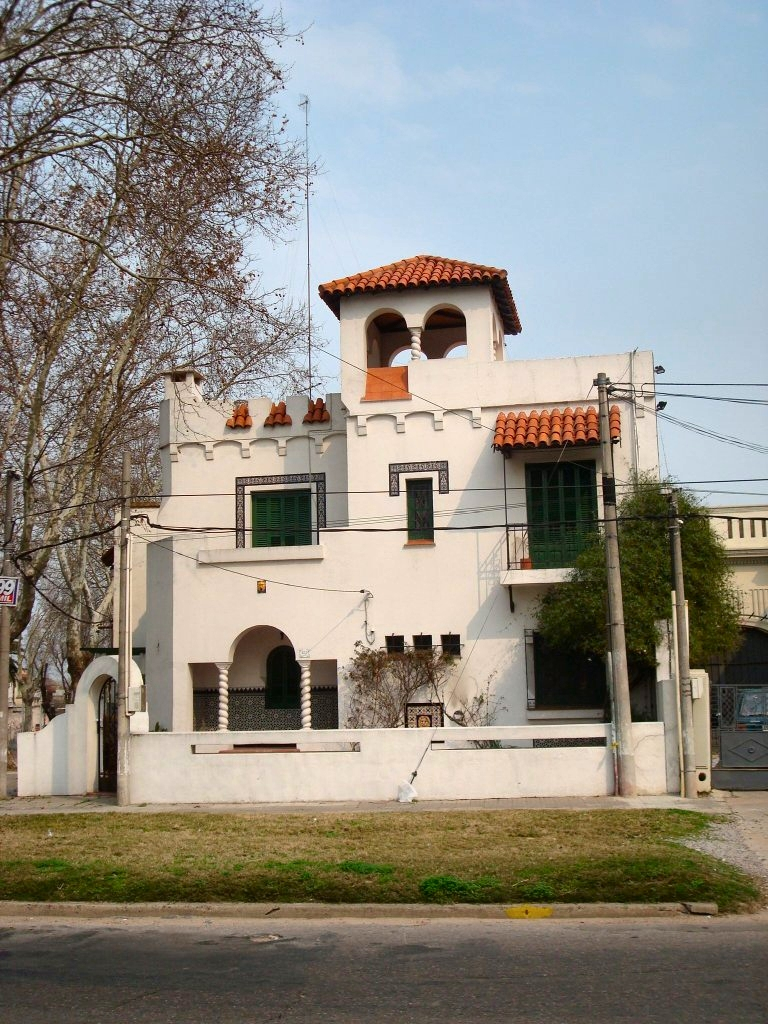
House on Luis Alberto Herrera Avenue at Brazo Oriental

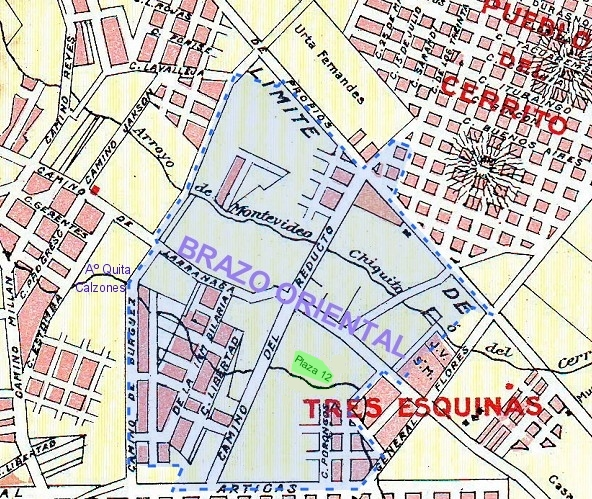
Detail from a 1905 map of Montevideo, Uruguay, showing the area of the actual barrio Brazo Oriental.

== See also ==
- Barrios of Montevideo
