= Museo de la Memoria (Uruguay) =

Museum in Montevideo, Uruguay

Coordinates: 34.84213°S 56.19856°W

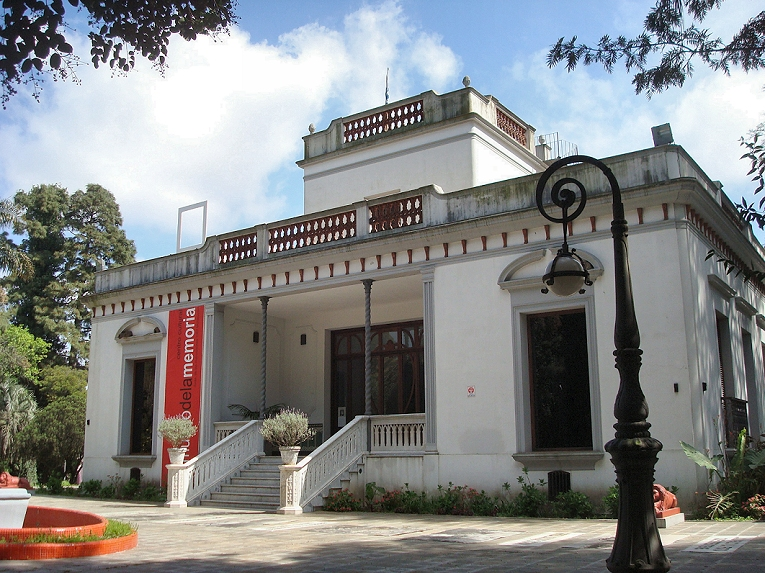
Museo de la Memoria, Paso de las Duranas

Museo de la Memoria (MUME) is a museum in Montevideo, Uruguay dedicated to the memory of those or died or were "disappeared" during the Uruguayan dictatorship of 1973 to 1985.

== The museum ==
Museo de la Memoria was established to commemorate the victims of crimes committed by the state, and the resistance of some Uruguayans in the face of this oppression, during the country's dictatorship. It aims to educate new generations about the country's recent history, to promote respect for human rights, and to remember the struggle for liberty, democracy and social justice. In having these as stated aims, it consciously attempts to strengthen important elements of Uruguayan national identity.

The museum opened to the public on 10 December 2007 and is run by the city government of Montevideo. It is located about 9 km (5.6 mi) from the centre of Montevideo's old town.

The permanent exhibition is focused around seven key themes:

1. The establishment of the dictatorship
2. Popular resistance
3. Prison life
4. Exile
5. The "Disappeared"
6. The restoration of democracy and the struggle for truth and justice
7. Unfinished history and new challenges

== History and architecture of the building ==
MUME is housed in a building which dates back to 1878 when it was built as the country retreat of Uruguayan soldier and later president Máximo Santos. The house, and the parkland in which it is situated, has been declared a National Historical Monument. The parkland, in particular, is unique to Montevideo, being the only remaining unchanged 19th-century parkland in the city.

The architectural style of the building is eclectic; though built mainly in Neoclassical fashion, its details incorporate elements of Art Nouveau. Borrowing also from Renaissance architecture, the building uses a piano nobile, or raised ground floor, which is accessed by marble steps. Immediately before the steps is a fountain in the shape of a boat. The main house is built in a horseshoe around a central patio containing another ornamental fountain.

Santos ruled Uruguay from 1882 until 1886. Shortly after leaving office, in 1887, he sold the site to Spanish businessman Emilio Reus. In 1920, the house was purchased by Lebanese immigrant Rezcala Neffa. Neffa, a rich industrialist, became a Uruguayan citizen and a philanthropist in his adopted country. On buying the house and parkland, he gave it over to the Uruguayan Navy, which used the site as offices and workshops for the Hydrographic Service.

By the 1970s, the site had been abandoned by the Navy and fell into disrepair.

In 2000, the city government of Montevideo, by now the owner of the site, started work on restoring the derelict buildings. The project was aided by a gift of US$800,000 from supermarket chain Disco, and aimed to create a site which could be used for a new cultural centre or museum, although exactly what the museum would showcase was, at that time, undecided. The restoration was completed in 2005.

== The parkland ==
The park is landscaped in a similarly eclectic style, borrowing from Italian Renaissance gardens, 19th century theories of health, and European landscape architecture. The idea of the country retreat was to combine a house for relaxation with a garden to be enjoyed. Its distance from the city centre, which is on the coast, is in line with the theory that country air was more healthy than air from the coast.

The park is around 4 ha (9.9 acres) in size and contains a long tree-lined access avenue, gardens of exotic species, a greenhouse, a nursery, a folly designed for children in the shape of a castle, fountains, sculpture, artificial caves and an aviary.
