= Parque Posadas =

Residential complex in Montevideo, Uruguay

Coordinates: 34.8565°S 56.194°W

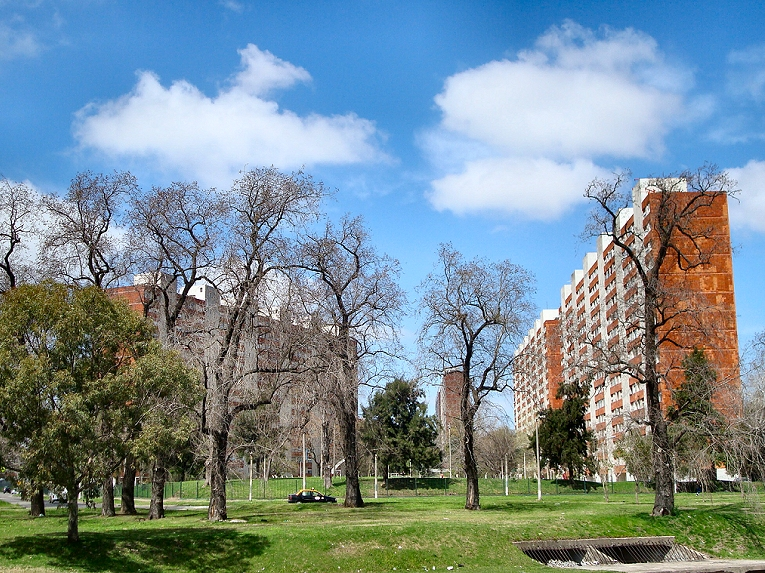
The Parque Posadas residential complex

The Parque Posadas (Posadas Park, in English) is a large apartments' complex placed in the geographical centre of Montevideo, Uruguay. It was built between 1969 and 1973, their firsts apartments were given that same year, although the official inauguration of the complex was August 25, 1975. It has a communal hall, a library, a shopping mall and a school. On the Parque Posadas environs there are many residences and old houses, a highschool, and several commerces, like bakeries, restaurants, ice cream shops and a big supermarket.

The complex is formed by 10 blocks of buildings, each one of which are formed, as well, by 6 or 7 towers of 13, 14 or 15 floors, depending on the inclination of its internal streets. More than 7000 people live in the 2051 apartments of 1, 2, 3 or 4 rooms of each one of the 61 towers that occupy the Park, who has an 11 hectares (3.4 km^{2}) area. 80% of the people are owners, and the dilatoriness in the common expenses is below of the 20%. The Parque Posadas' Library has more than 35,000 volumes, which turns it in the most important private library of the country.

== Government ==
The Parque Posadas has a Government's Central Assembly, constituted by one representative of each tower, plus the president, the vice-president and the secretary. Each tower has, as well, an independent government, constituted by three members. The administrator of each tower is the Assembly's delegate, who delegates, as well, to an accountant to take care of the general administration.

== History ==
The original idea of building a habitational complex in this area of the department arose from the elaboration of a program destined to give houses to 400 greater adults, with all kind of services, like doctors, cinema, gymnasium, libraries, places of relaxation and shopping. However, by 1969, when the National Plan of House was approved, it was no longer possible to use that enormous estate of 11 hectares to lodge so few people, reason why it began the idea of using that estate as an ideal place for the house construction, due to its centric location, the existence of many services in the area, etc. This way a pilot plan that preview the construction of 2051 apartments with a capacity of 10,000 people was designed.

The Parque Posadas was devised and constructed considering several elements, specially the preoccupation to preserve an excellent illumination and to border the land with the objective to generate a microclimate that protected the most aged trees.
