= Jardines del Hipódromo, Montevideo =

Jardines del Hipódromo
- Barrio
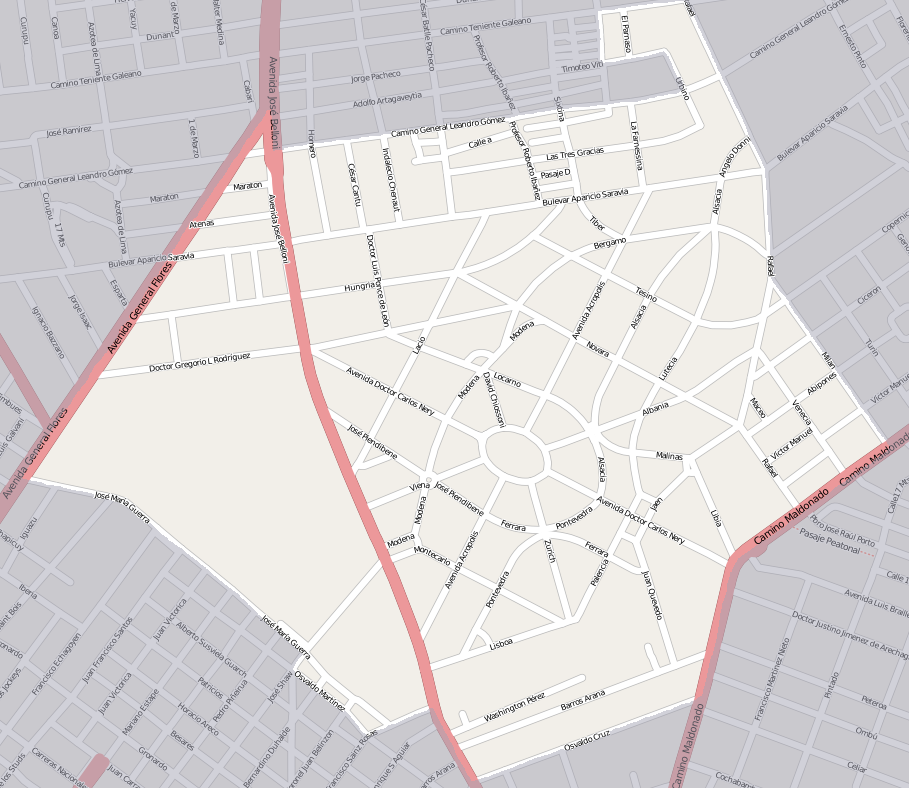
- Street map of Jardines del Hipódromo

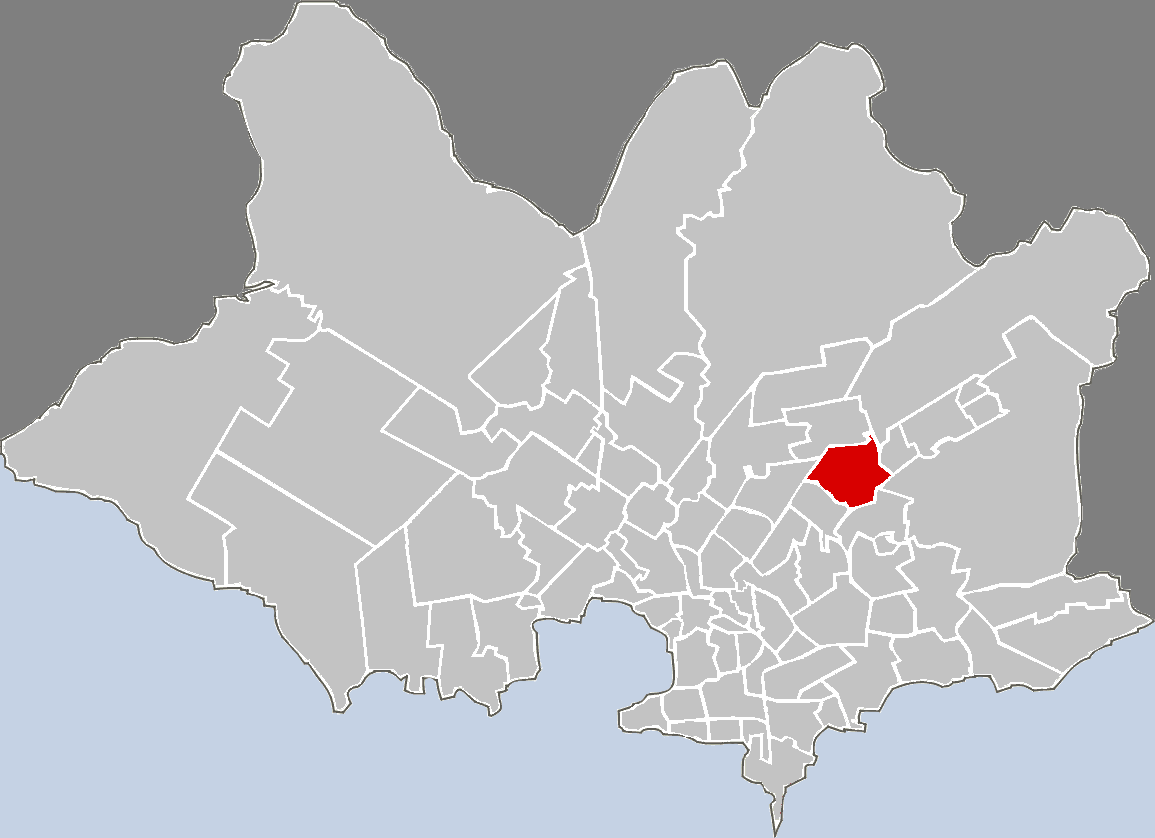
- Location of Jardines del Hipódromo in Montevideo
- Coordinates: 34°50′14″S 56°7′55″W
- Country: Uruguay
- Department: Montevideo Department
- City: Montevideo

Jardines del Hipódromo is a barrio (neighbourhood or district) of Montevideo, Uruguay.

== Educational facilities ==
- Colegio y Liceo Beata Imelda, Camino Maldonado 5853 (private, Roman Catholic, Dominican Sisters of the Annunciation of the Blessed Virgin)

== Places of worship ==
- Parish Church of the Most Holy Trinity and the Holy Family, Camino Maldonado 5842 (Roman Catholic, Dominicans)
- Mater Admirabilis Parish Church, Av. Dr. Carlos Nery 3626 (Roman Catholic)

== See also ==
- Barrios of Montevideo
