= Paso de las Duranas =

- Barrio
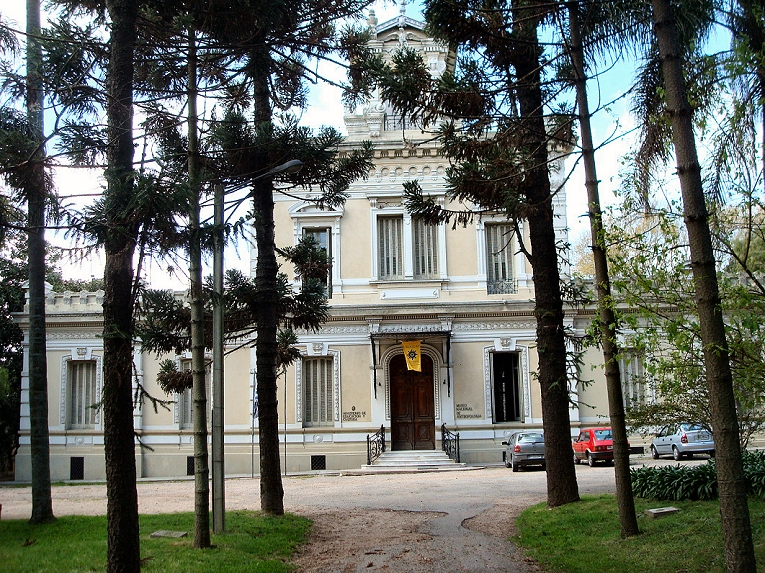
- National Museum of Anthropology

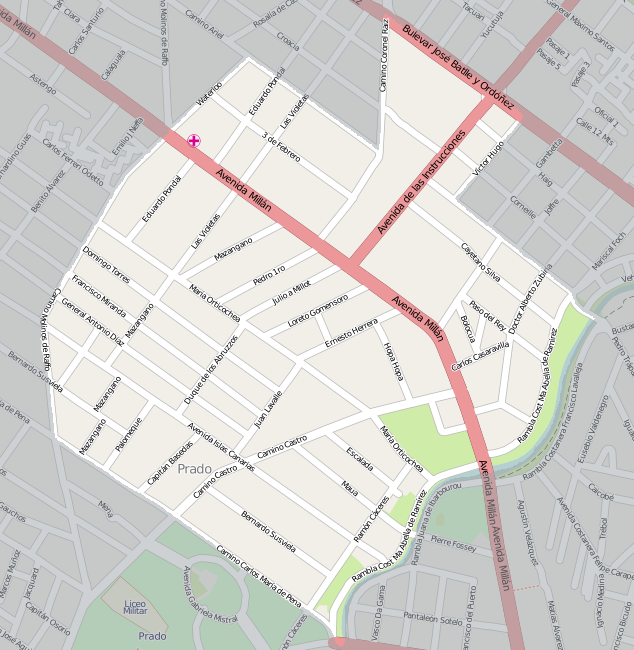
- Street map of Paso de las Duranas

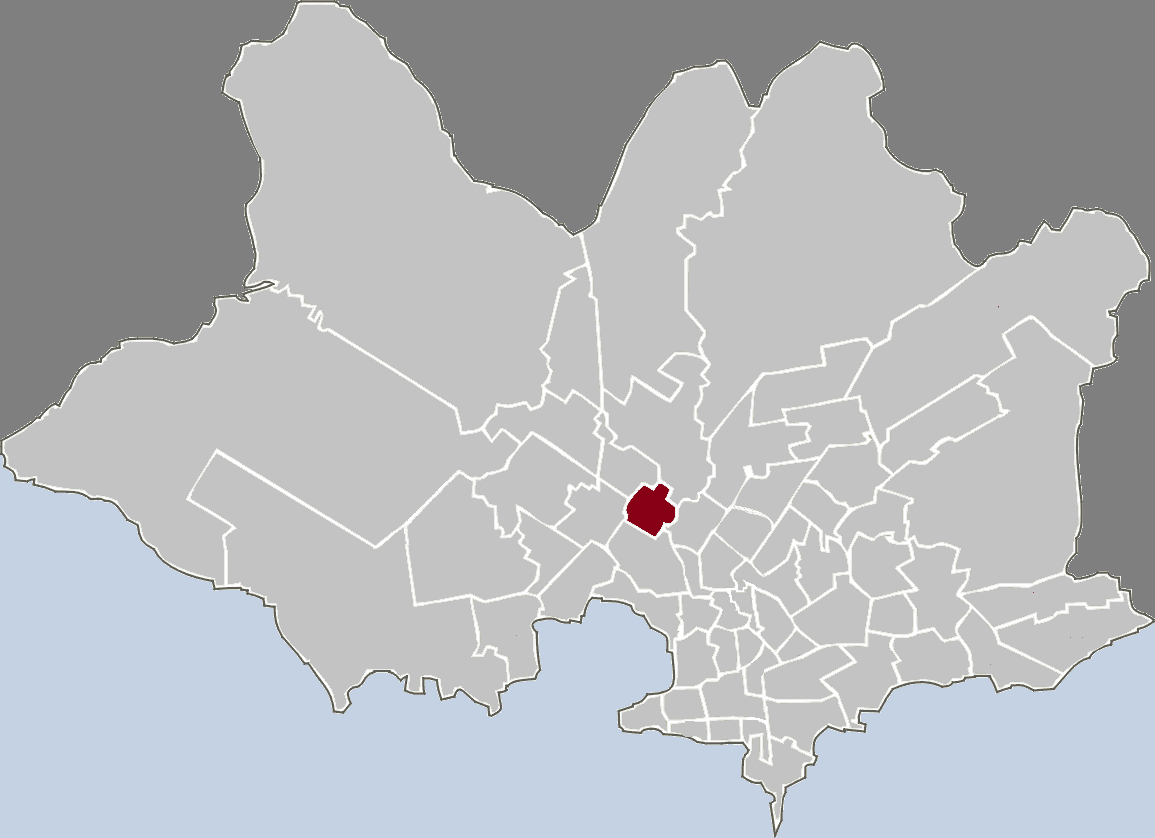
- Location of Paso de las Duranas in Montevideo
- Coordinates: 34°50′40″S 56°11′51″W
- Country: Uruguay
- Department: Montevideo Department
- City: Montevideo

Paso de las Duranas is a cultural center in Montevideo, Uruguay.

== Location ==
It is located in Aires Puros, between Belvedere and Sayago to the northwest, Lavalleja to the north and Prado to the south.

== Landmarks ==
Paso de las Duranas is home to the National Museum of Anthropology and to the Museo de la Memoria, which is dedicated to the history of the fight of the Uruguayan people against the repression of the dictatorship. In its east side it also contains the northmost edge of the Prado park, where the former building of the Sociedad Nativista was transformed into a museum.

== Educational facilities ==
- Colegio y Liceo Mariano (private, Roman Catholic, Oblates of St. Francis de Sales)

== Places of worship ==
- Church of the Immaculate Conception, Casaravilla 867 esq. Av. Millán; popularly known as "Iglesia de Paso de las Duranas" (Roman Catholic, Oblates of St. Francis de Sales)

== See also ==
- Barrios of Montevideo
