= Greek Uruguayans =

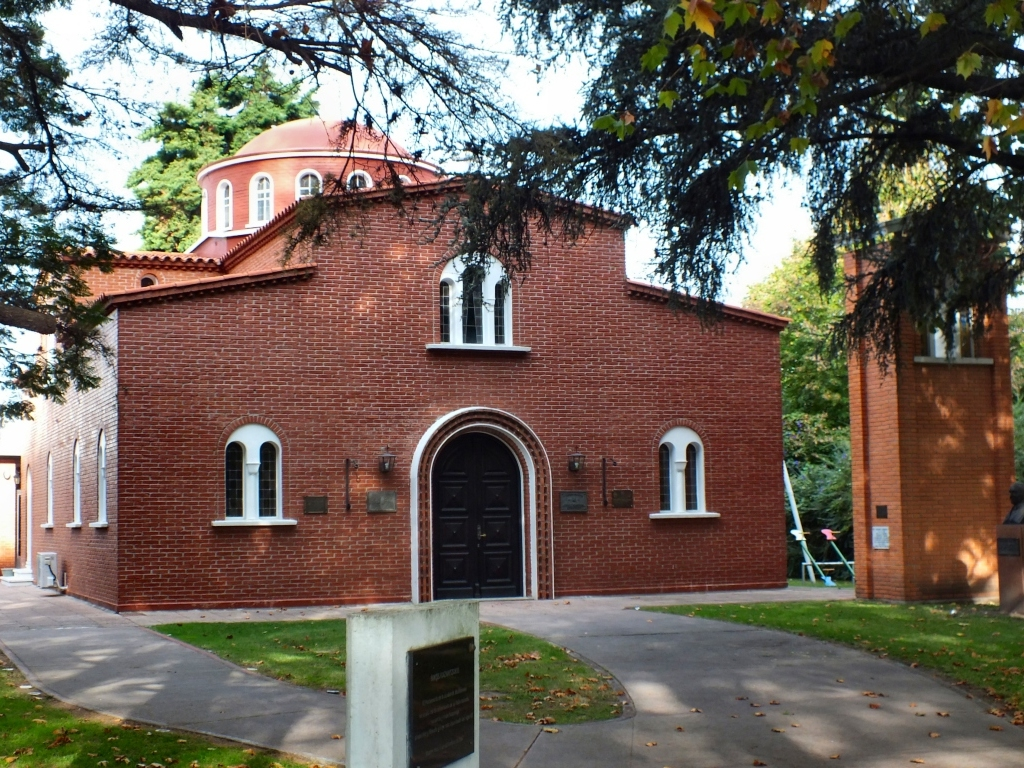
Greek Orthodox Church in Montevideo.

Greek Uruguayans (Greek: Έλληνες της Ουρουγουάης) are Uruguayan residents either fully or partially of Greek descent or Greece-born people who reside in Uruguay.

== Overview ==
The Greek community in Uruguay; most of them live in the Montevideo area. Some of them also settled in the frontier city of Rivera.

The 2011 Uruguayan census revealed 103 people who declared Greece as their country of birth.

There was also a very small number of Greek Jews.

== Notable people ==
- Fernando Kanapkis, footballer
- Obdulio Varela, footballer
- Carlos Linaris, footballer
- Graciela Paraskevaidis, musicologist
- Circe Maia, poet

== See also ==
- Greek people
- Greek diaspora
- Greek-Uruguayan relations
