= Juan Manuel Blanes Museum =

Art museum in Montevideo, Uruguay

Coordinates: 32°31′22″S 55°45′57″W

Juan Manuel Blanes Municipal Museum of Arts
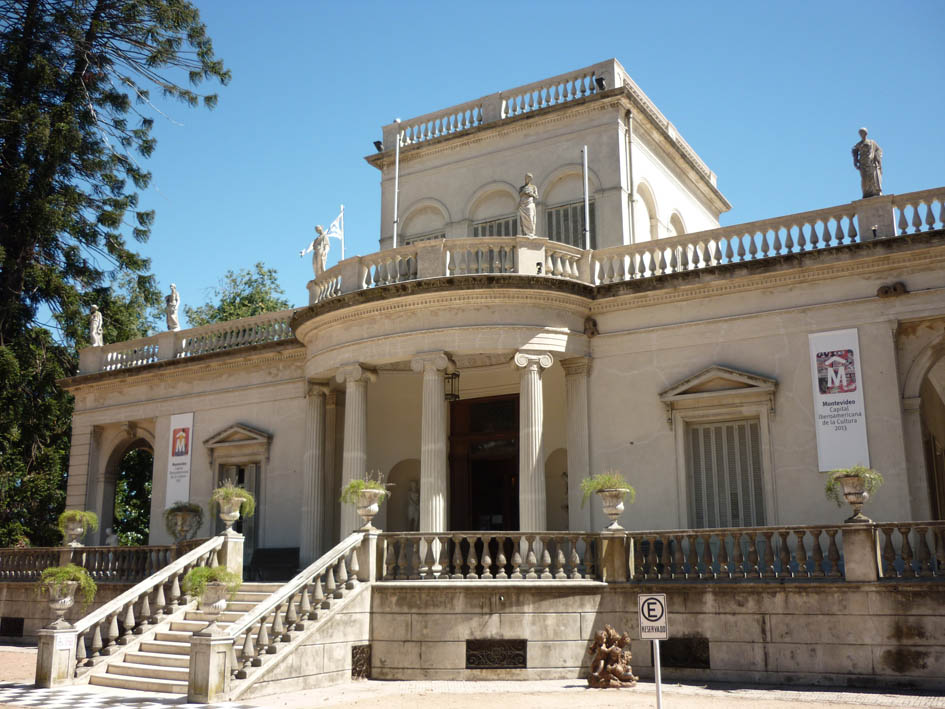
- Established: 1930
- Location: Prado, Montevideo (Uruguay)
- Type: Municipal
- Director: Cristina Bausero
- Website: blanes.montevideo.gub.uy

Juan Manuel Blanes Municipal Museum of the Arts (Spanish: Museo de Bellas Artes Juan Manuel Blanes) is a museum in Prado, Montevideo, Uruguay.

== Location and history ==
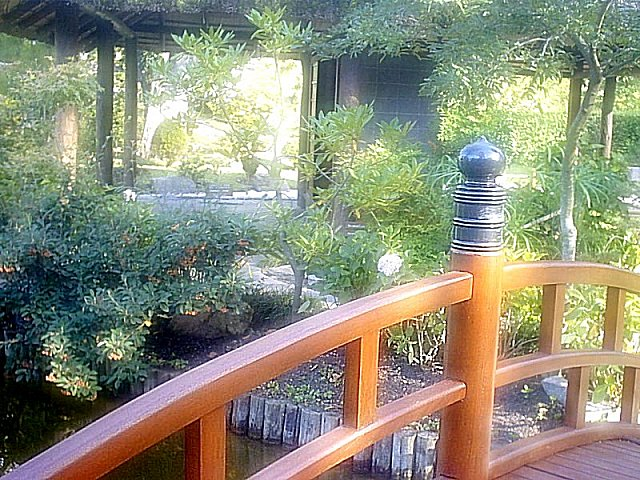
Japanese park, Museo de Bellas Artes Juan Manual Blanes (Prado, Montevideo)

The Juan Manuel Blanes Municipal Museum of the Arts is located at Avenida Millan 4015, in the neighbourhood of Prado, Montevideo, in a Palladian villa designated a National Heritage Site in 1975. The villa was originally designed in 1870 by Juan Alberto Capurro, an engineer trained at the Turin Polytechnic, for the then-owner Dr. Juan Battista Raffo. The surrounding garden reveals elements of French landscape design. The municipality acquired the villa in 1929, when it commissioned the architect Eugenio Baroffio to renovate and expand the building. Baroffio maintained the eclecticism of the original design, leaving the facade intact. The museum was founded in 1930, coinciding with the 100th anniversary of the first Constitution of Uruguay, and named after the patriotic Uruguayan artist, Juan Manuel Blanes.

== Park and gardens ==
This property has a big park full of ancient trees, on the shore of the Miguelete Creek.

Behind the museum can be found the Japanese Garden.

== Collections ==
The museum displays Uruguayan art ranging from the nation's founding to the present day, including the works of Juan Manuel Blanes, Pedro Figari, Rafael Barradas, José Cúneo, and Carlos González.

== Hours and operation ==
The museum is open from 12pm to 5:45 p.m. every day from Tuesday through Sunday. It does not charge admission.

== See also ==
- List of museums in Uruguay
- Parque Prado
