= Dominican Sisters of the Annunciation of the Blessed Virgin =

The Dominican Sisters of the Annunciation of the Blessed Virgin or Dominican Sisters of the Anunciata constitute a Catholic religious congregation of apostolic life and pontifical right, founded in Vic (Catalonia, Spain) by the Dominican religious, Francisco Coll, on August 15, 1856.

== History ==
The decision to found this Congregation arises from Francisco Coll (1812-1875), a Dominican religious who dedicated himself to the Popular Missions. He, moved by the social and religious reality he observed in the course of his missions, began to worry about the lack of access to education, especially in small towns and girls. In turn, he knew several young women who wanted to consecrate themselves to God as religious, but because of their poverty they did not have easy entry into the monasteries of the time, which demanded an economic dowry. Coll then decided to found a new religious Congregation that did not require such a requirement and that was primarily concerned with education. Thus, on August 15, 1856, in the city of Vic, with the first seven young women, he founded the Tertiary Sisters of Saint Dominic, then called Dominican Sisters of the Anunciata.

The beginnings were difficult because of the lack of financial means, to the point that the bishop suggested Coll to close the institute and dismissed the girls. But thanks to the perseverance of the founder and also to the help of some religious (like his friend Antonio María Claret) they were able to get ahead. Soon he had the invaluable collaboration of a young teacher, Rosa Santaeugenia (1831-1889), who was the first prioress general of the congregation. Despite the difficult beginnings, the congregation had an extraordinary growth, reaching 50 communities the year of the death of its founder. From the beginning Coll inserted the new Institute in the Order of Preachers, of Saint Dominic de Guzmán. The first communities of the Dominican Sisters of the Anunciata were located in the rural areas of Catalonia, often obtaining religious places in the public schools. However, as a result of the socio-political situation - the September 1868 revolution - some sisters were forced to leave these schools and the foundation of small private schools was expanded, many of them in the vicinity of textile factories.

In 1880 the congregation began its expansion outside Catalonia, in Albacete (1880) and in the mining areas of Asturias (1897). The first foundation outside Spain was in Argentina (1909), and from there it spread to other countries in South America. In 1933 was the foundation in France, and then in other European countries. In 1955 the congregation extended its missionary action to Central America, in 1969 to Africa and in 1988 to Asia.

== Mission ==
The mission of the congregation, since its foundation in 1856, is oriented especially towards education and evangelization, being present in the integral formation of children and youth, parish activity, missionary activity and also in the world of health.

Its objective is to "Announce the message of salvation to all, especially to children and youth", in large and small towns, and from a definite option for the most needy.

== Expansion ==
As of 2019, the Congregation of Dominican Sisters of the Anunciata has about 900 sisters and it is extended over 20 countries in four continents:

• Europe: France, Italy and Spain

• Latin America: Argentina, Brazil, Chile, Costa Rica, Guatemala, Mexico, Nicaragua, Paraguay, Peru, El Salvador and Uruguay

• Africa: Benin, Cameroon, Ivory Coast and Rwanda

• Asia: Philippines, Vietnam

== Religious martyrs ==
The congregation has seven sisters who died martyrs in the religious persecution in Spain in 1936. Their names are: Ramona Fossas, Adelfa Soro, Teresa Prats, Ramona Perramón, Otilia Alonso, Reginalda Picas and Rosa Jutglar. They were beatified by Pope Benedict XVI on October 28, 2007, along with 491 other martyrs of the same persecution. Their liturgical feast is celebrated on November 6.

== Bibliography ==
- Equipo de investigación del carisma (2018). Compendio de historia de la Congregación HH. Dominicas de la Anunciata. HH. Dominicas de la Anunciata, Madrid
- Gómez García, Vito T. (1993): Francisco Coll, O.P. Testimonios (1812 - 1931). HH. Dominicas de la Anunciata, Valencia
- Gómez García, Vito T. (2009): El padre Coll, dominico: Francisco Coll y Guitart, santo fundador de las Dominicas de la Anunciata. EDIBESA, Madrid
- González González, Ma. Otilia (2008): Francisco Coll y Guitart, O.P.: Fondateur de la Congrégation des Soeurs Dominicaines de la Anunciata
