= Juan D. Jackson =

Uruguayan businessman

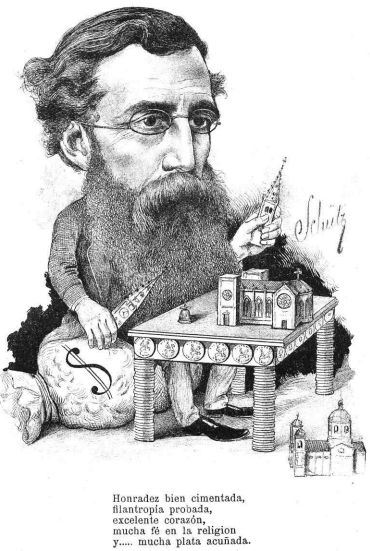
Juan Damask Jackson Errazquin

Juan Dámaso Jackson Errazquin (7 October 1833, in Montevideo – 19 December 1892, in Montevideo) was a Uruguayan businessman and philanthropist.

== Biography ==
Son of the British immigrant John Jackson and the Uruguayan lady Clara Errazquin Larrañaga, his godfather was his grand-uncle Dámaso Antonio Larrañaga. He studied at Stonyhurst College and afterwards in the United States.

Upon the death of his father he came back to Uruguay and undertook an important activity in the agricultural field, both commercially and in education. The Agricultural School in Manga was a pioneering institution for educating agricultural technicians (nowadays that settlement has been transformed into a development with the name of Jacksonville).

He was also a philanthropist, contributing to the establishment of the Salesians of Don Bosco in Uruguay.

The fact of his father being Protestant and his mother Catholic made him a very tolerant person in religious matters, notwithstanding the fact that he was a Roman Catholic.

His remains are buried at the Jackson Chapel.
