= Miguelete Creek =

Coordinates: 34.8727°S 56.2257°W

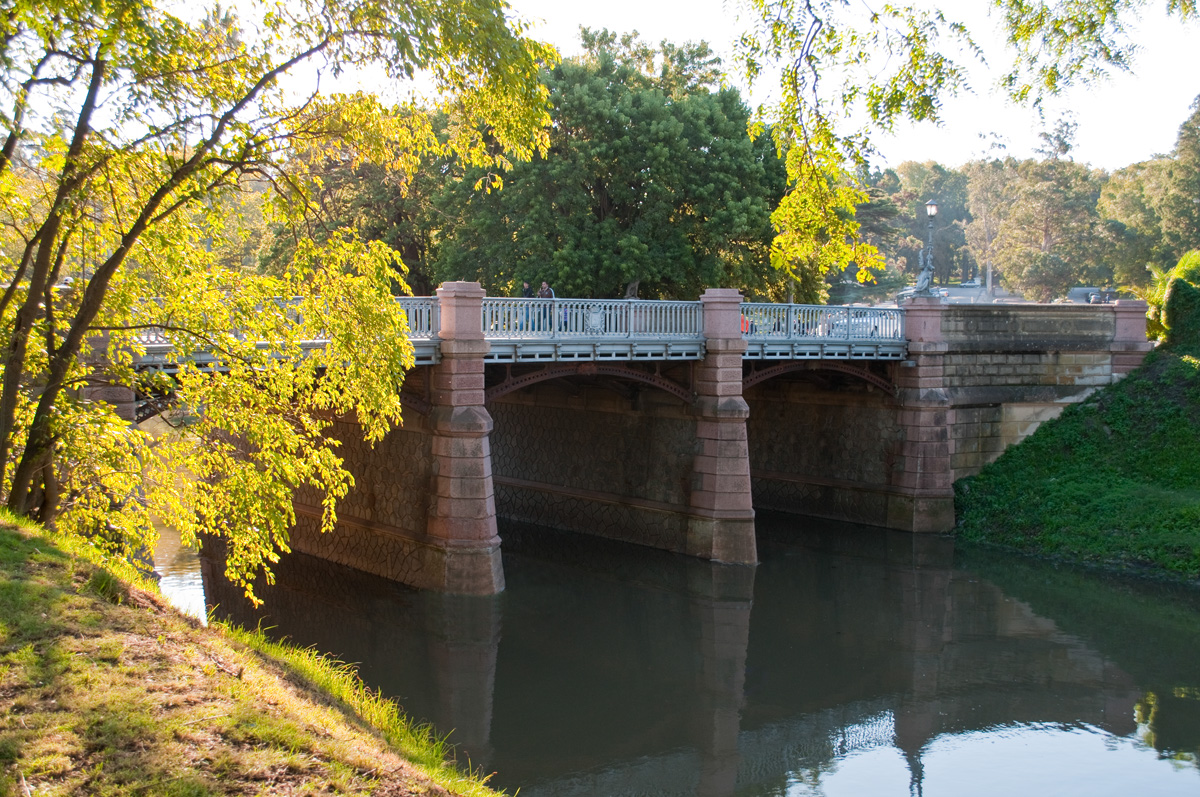

Location
- Country: Uruguay

Physical characteristics
- Length: 22 km (14 mi)
- Basin size: 112 km^{2} (43 sq mi)
- Discharge
  - average: Río de la Plata

Miguelete Creek (Spanish: Arroyo Miguelete) is a Uruguayan stream, crossing Montevideo Department. It flows into the Bay of Montevideo and then into the Río de la Plata. It has a very significant history behind, since colonial times.

Near its shores are located the big urban park known as Prado and the historical Juan Manuel Blanes Museum.

== See also ==
- List of rivers of Uruguay
