= Casavalle =

- Barrio
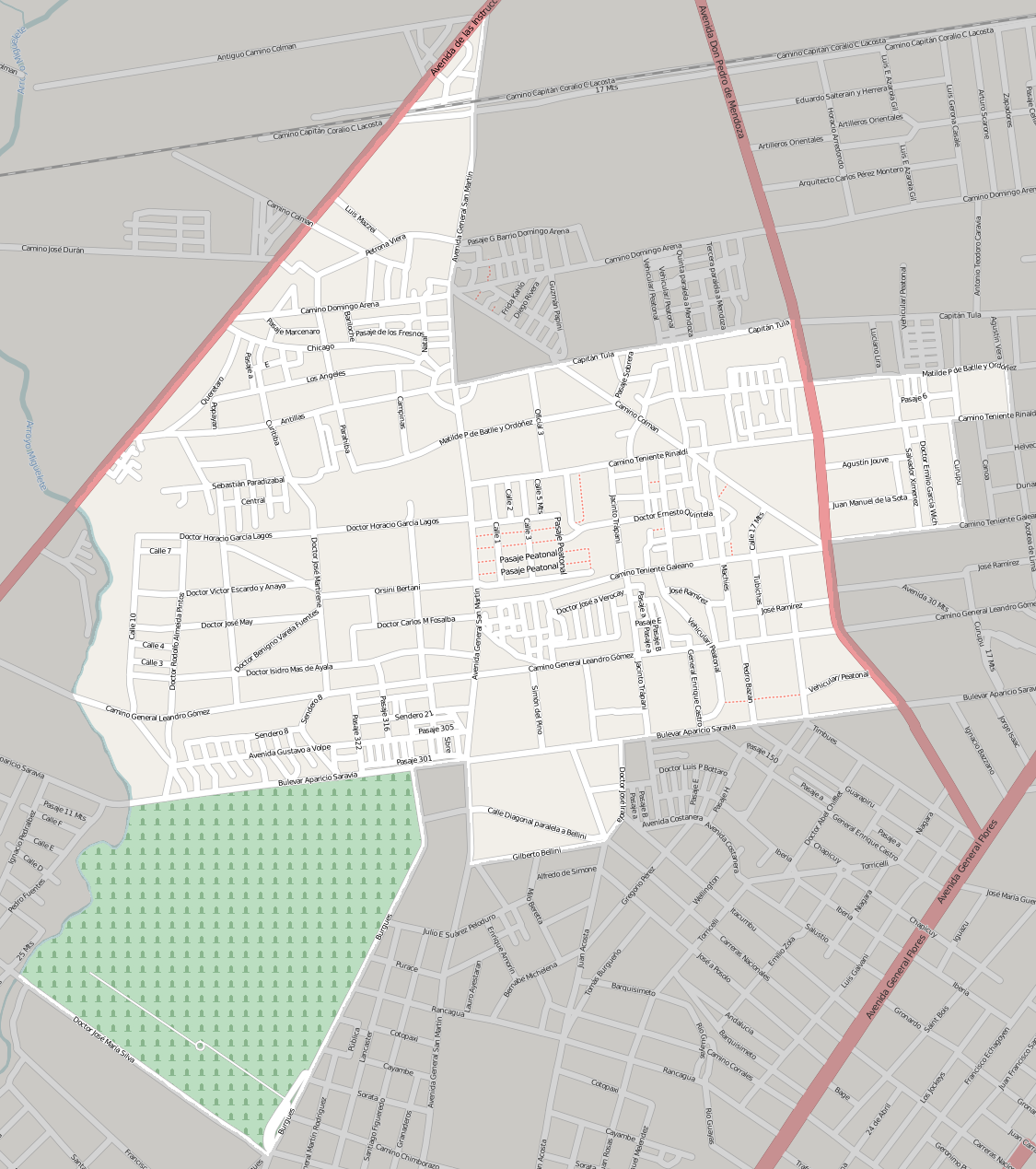
- Street map of Casavalle. Limits of barrio shown according to the INE map of 2004.

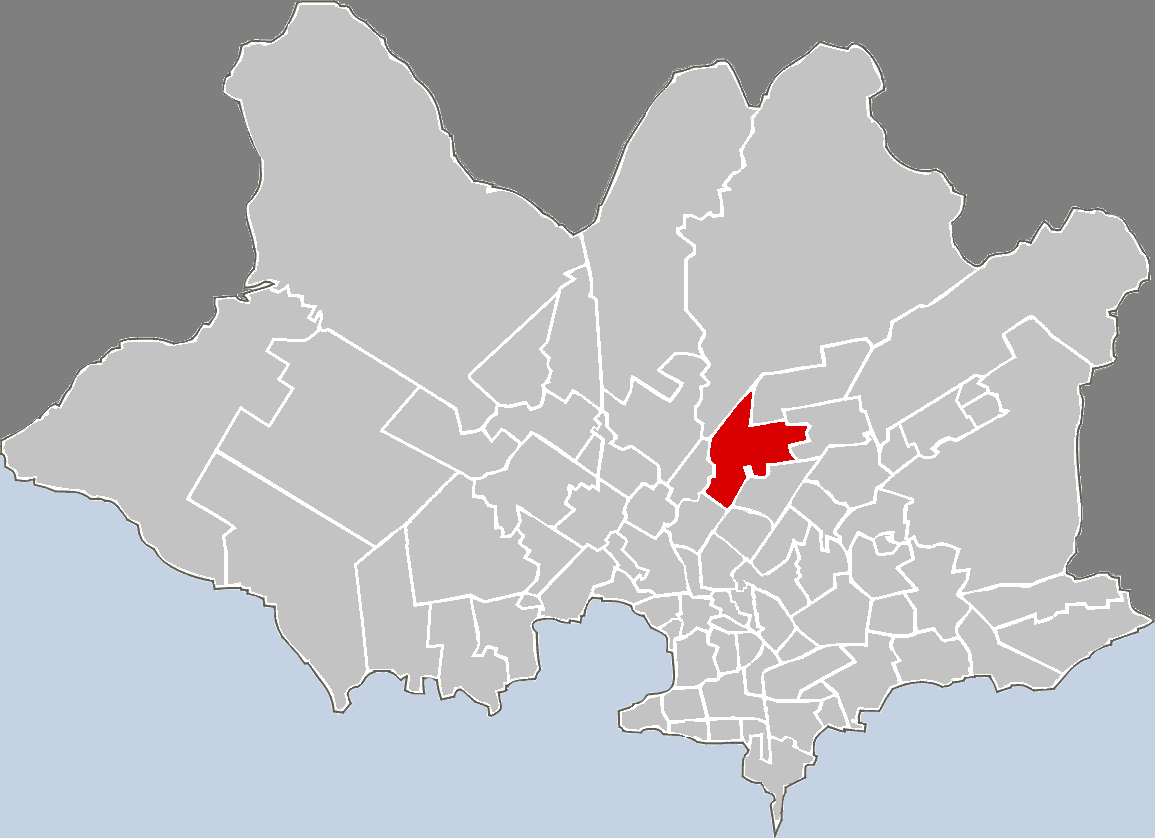
- Location of Casavalle in Montevideo
- Coordinates: 34°49′46″S 56°10′9″W
- Country: Uruguay
- Department: Montevideo Department
- City: Montevideo
- Website: http://www.casavalledigital.com/

Casavalle is a barrio of Montevideo, Uruguay. In the new division of Montevideo in Municipios and Centros Comunales Zonales, Casavalle belongs to CCZ 11 of Municipio D.

== Location ==
Casavalle borders the barrios Manga, Toledo Chico and Manga to the north, Piedras Blancas to the east, Las Acacias, Montevideo and Cerrito de la Victoria to the southeast, and Peñarol - Lavalleja to the west.

== Districts ==
According to its official website, the districts that belong to Casavalle are: Barrio Unidad Casavalle, Barrio Unidad Misiones, Barrio Borro, Borro Este, Barrio Bonomi, Barrio Municipal, Barrio Plácido Ellauri, Barrio Nuevo Ellauri, Barrio Jardines de Instrucciones. According to the same source, the limits of the barrio are: Aparicio Saravia Boulevard, Pedro de Mendoza Avenue, Camino Carlos A. López, Instrucciones Avenue and the stream Arroyo Miguelete. According to the limits traced by the Instituto Nacional de Estadistica in 2004, the Cementerio del Norte, by far the biggest cemetery of Montevideo, as well as a small area east of Pedro de Mendoza Avenue are part of this barrio.

== History ==
Formerly, Cassavalle was an independent village of the Montevideo department. In Casavalle have lived great personalities of the history of the Rio de la Plata, as Cap. Jacinto Trápani, a member of the liberation campaign (33 orientales), Pedro Casavalle and Pérez Castellanos, as well as great poets like Ildefonso Pereda Valdés and Fernán Silva Valdés. In 1908, mainly by the creation of Barrio Plácido Ellauri by Francisco Piria, a transformation of the locality started, which eventually integrated Casavalle to the urban area of Montevideo.

== Educational facilities ==
- Liceo Jubilar Juan Pablo II (private, Roman Catholic)
- Colegio Cristo Divino Obrero (private, Roman Catholic, Dehonians)
- Colegio Santa Bernardita (private, Roman Catholic, Dehonians)

== Places of worship ==
- Parish Church of Our Lady of Guadalupe (Roman Catholic, Dehonians)

== See also ==
- Barrios of Montevideo
