= Sayago, Montevideo =

Sayago
- Barrio
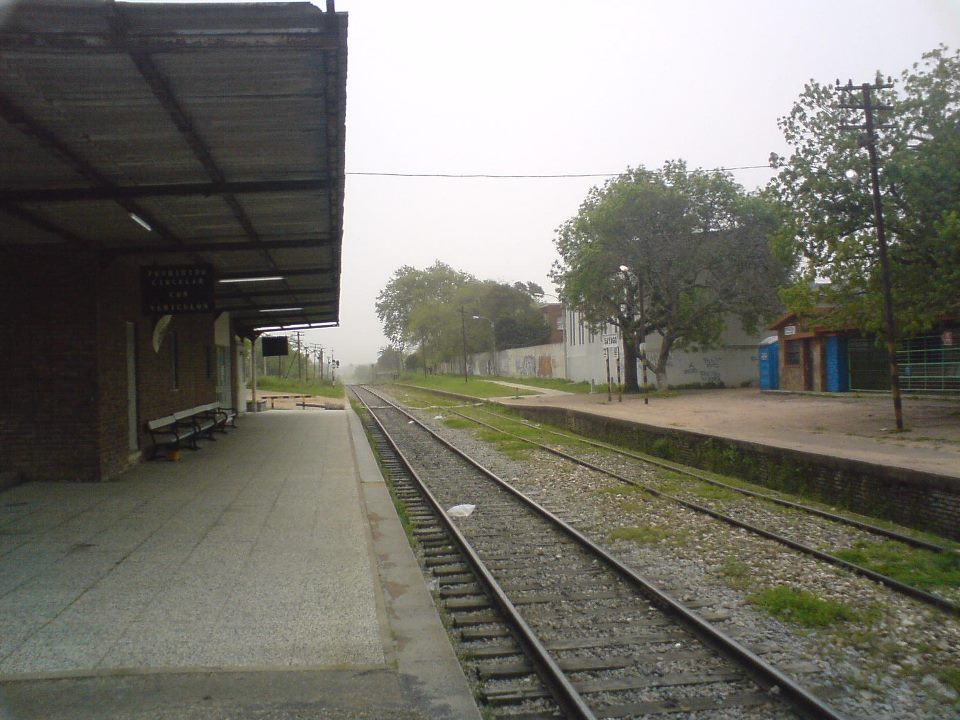
- The train station of Sayago

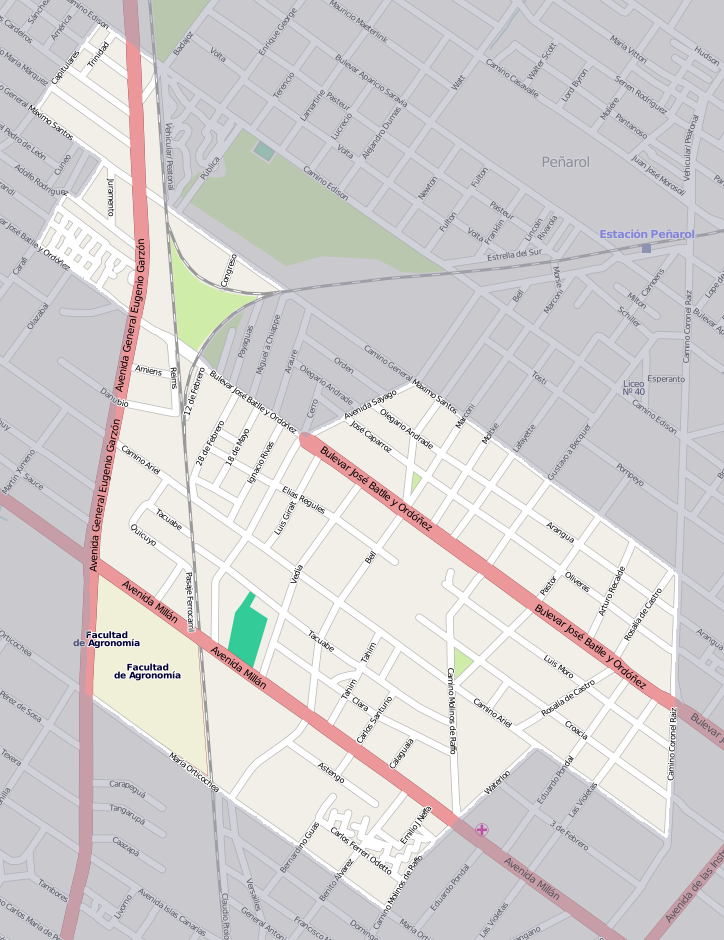
- Street map of Sayago

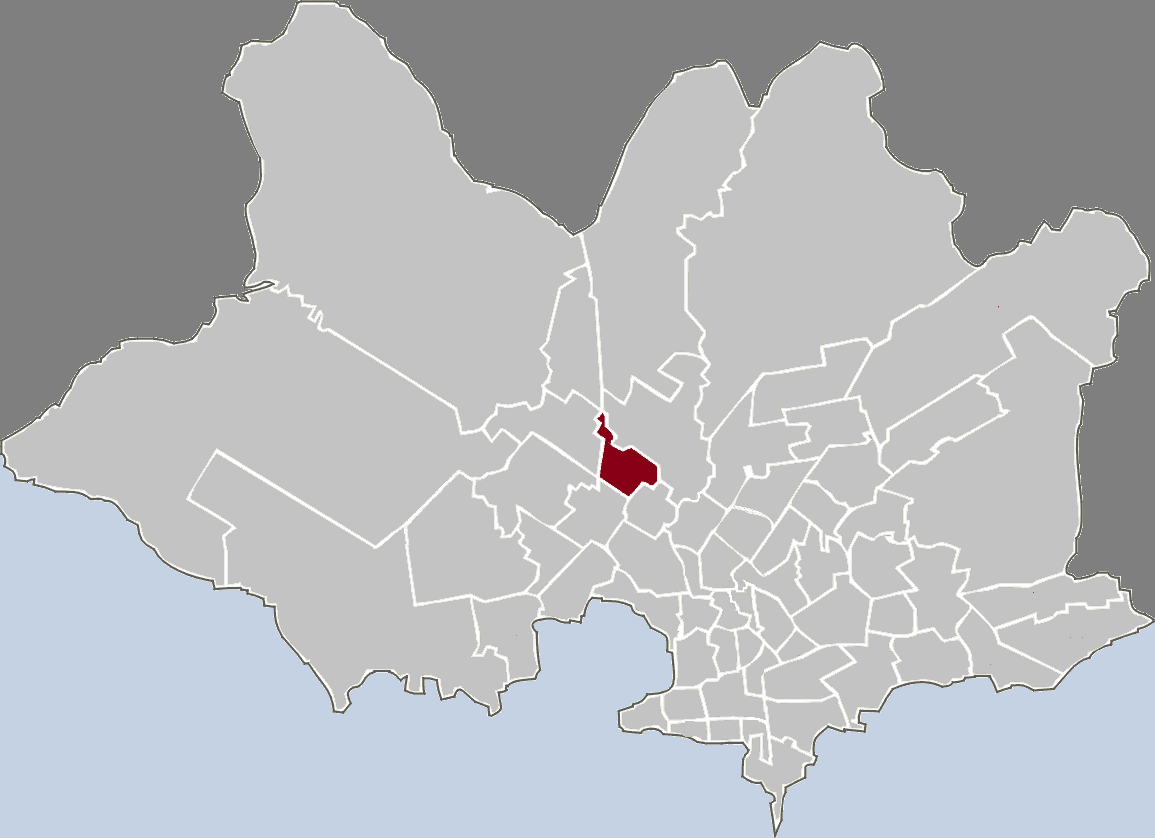
- Location of Sayago in Montevideo
- Coordinates: 34°50′9″S 56°12′45″W
- Country: Uruguay
- Department: Montevideo Department
- City: Montevideo

Sayago is a barrio (neighbourhood or district) of Montevideo, Uruguay.

== Location ==
This barrio borders Sayago Norte-Conciliación to the northwest, Peñarol - Lavalleja to the northeast, Paso de las Duranas to the southeast and Belvedere to the southwest.

== History ==
It was founded in 1873 and was declared a "Pueblo" (village) on 10 March 1913 by the Act of Ley N° 4.311. On 1 July 1953, its status was elevated to "Villa" (town) by the Act of Ley N° 11.966. Eventually, it has been integrated to Montevideo.

== Places of worship ==
- Our Lady of Lebanon Church (Eastern Catholic, Maronite)

== See also ==
- Barrios of Montevideo
