= Pérez Castellanos =

Castro - Pérez Castellanos
- Barrio
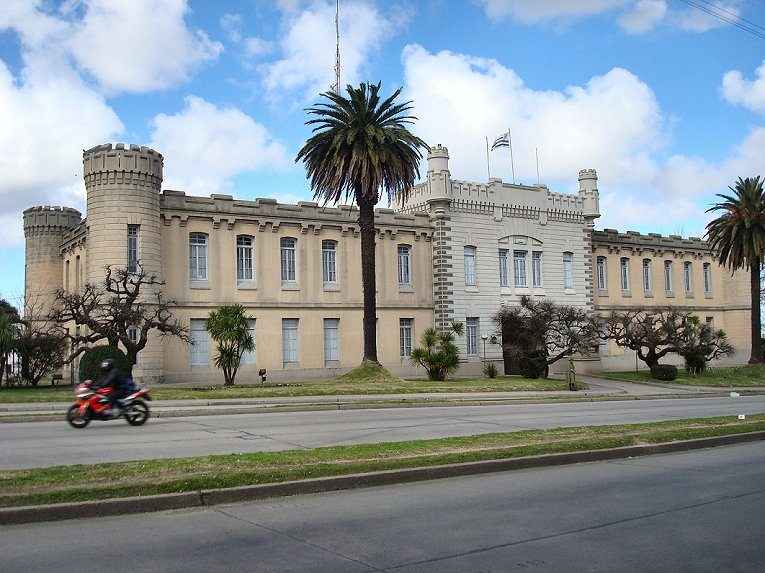
- Cuartel Blandengues de Artigas

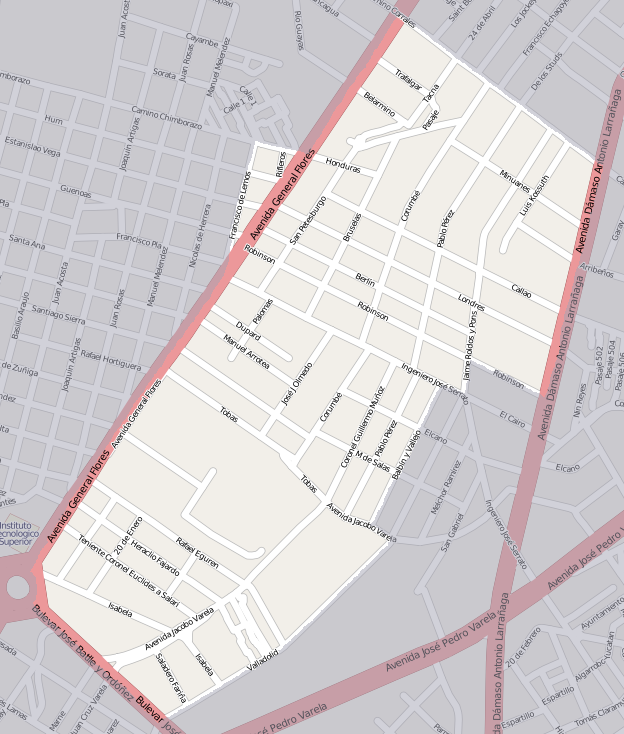
- Street map of Castro - Castellanos

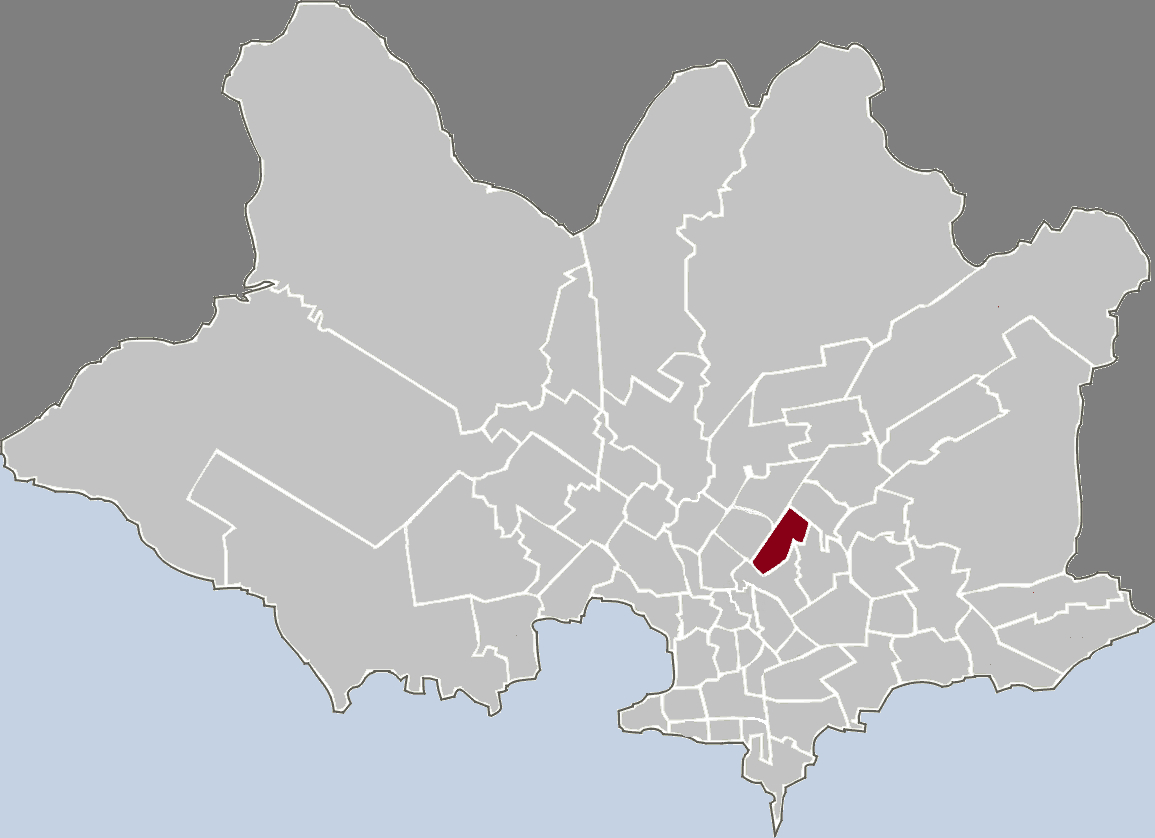
- Location of Castro - Castellanos in Montevideo
- Coordinates: 34°51′21″S 56°9′29″W
- Country: Uruguay
- Department: Montevideo Department
- City: Montevideo

Pérez Castellanos, also known as Castro - Pérez Castellanos, is a barrio (neighbourhood or district) of Montevideo, Uruguay. In the new division of Montevideo in municipalities and "communal centre zones", Pérez Castellanos belongs to municipality D and CCZ 11.

== Location ==
This barrio borders Cerrito to the west, Las Acacias to the northwest, Ituzaingó to the northeast, Villa Española to the east and Bolívar to the southwest. It is home to the barracks of the "Blandengues de Artigas".

== Places of worship ==
- Parish Church of the Annunciation (Roman Catholic)
- Parish Church of Our Lady of the Foundation (Roman Catholic)

== See also ==
- Barrios of Montevideo
