= Villa Española =

- Barrio
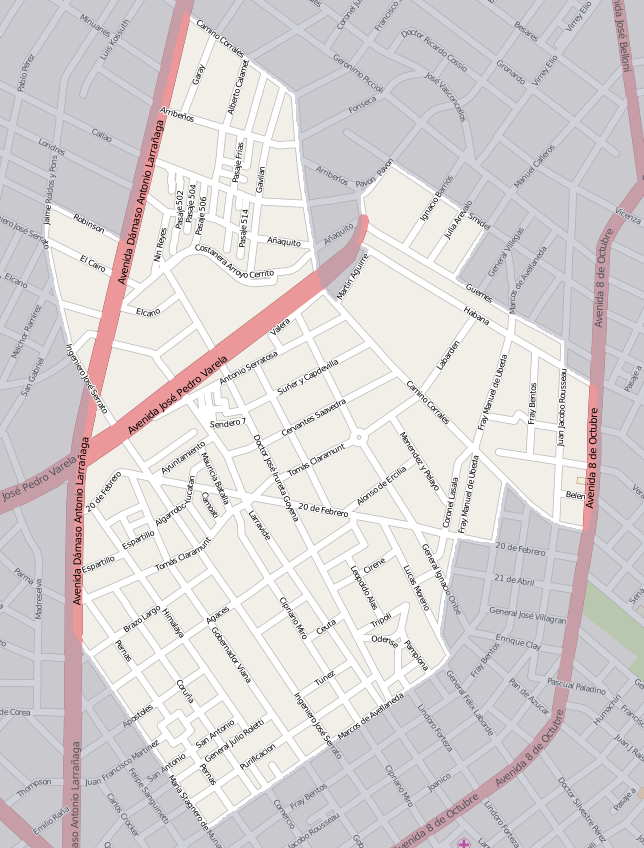
- Street map of Villa Española

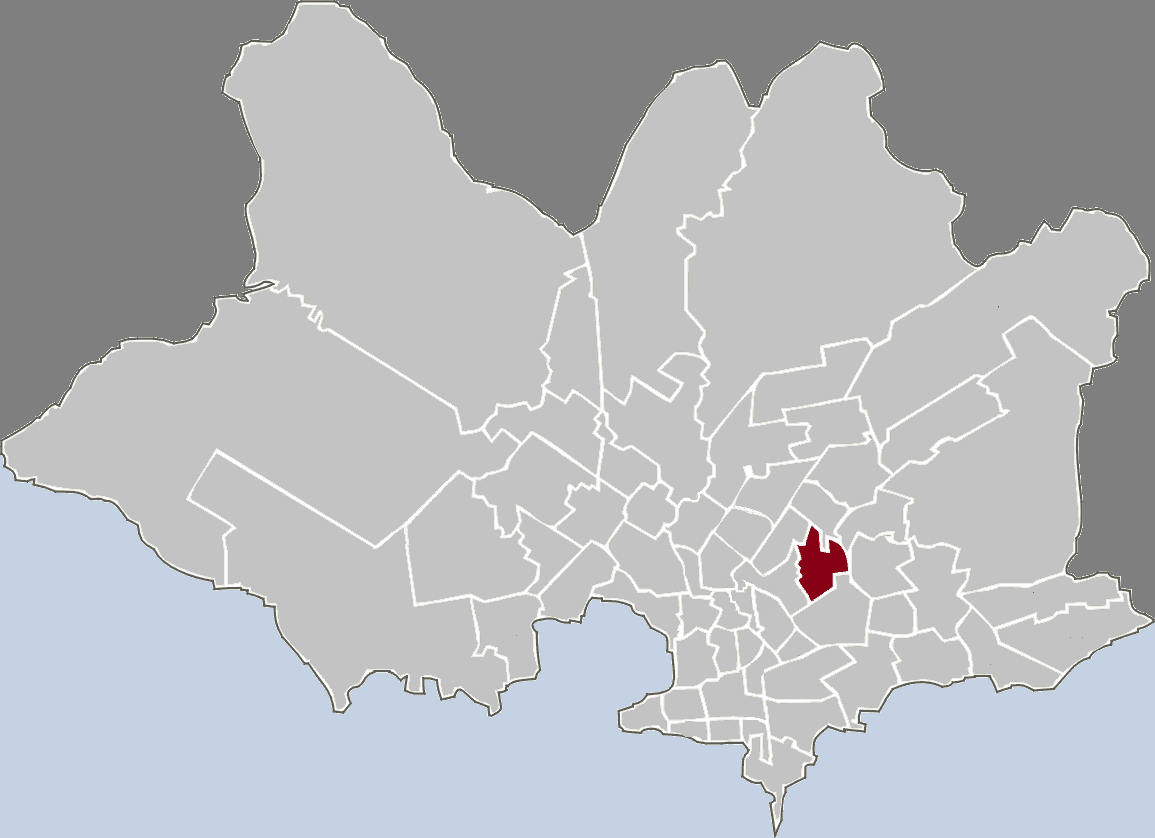
- Location of Villa Española in Montevideo
- Coordinates: 34°51′50″S 56°8′41″W
- Country: Uruguay
- Department: Montevideo Department
- City: Montevideo

Villa Española is a barrio (neighbourhood or district) of Montevideo.

== Location ==
This barrio shares borders with Bolívar to the west, Pérez Castellanos to the northwest, Ituzaingó to the north, Flor de Maroñas to the northeast, Maroñas to the east and Unión to the south.

== Sports ==
Villa Española is home to the C.S.D. Villa Española Boxing and Sports Club.

== Places of worship ==
- Parish Church of the Sacred Heart of Jesus, Vera 2594 (Roman Catholic)
- Parish Church of St. Vincent de Paul, Leopoldo Alas 2940 (Roman Catholic)

== See also ==
- Barrios of Montevideo
