= Manga, Montevideo =

Manga
- Barrio
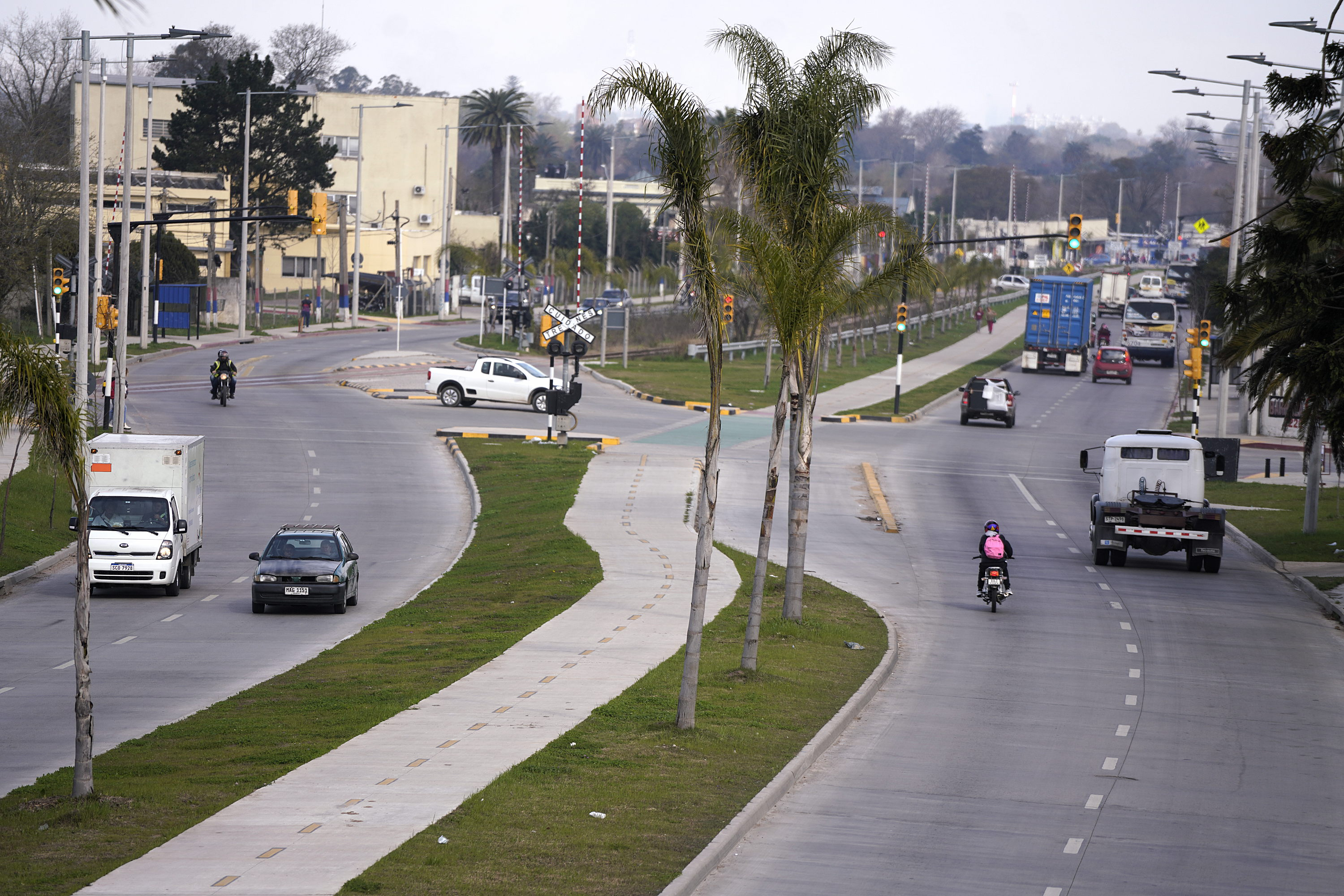

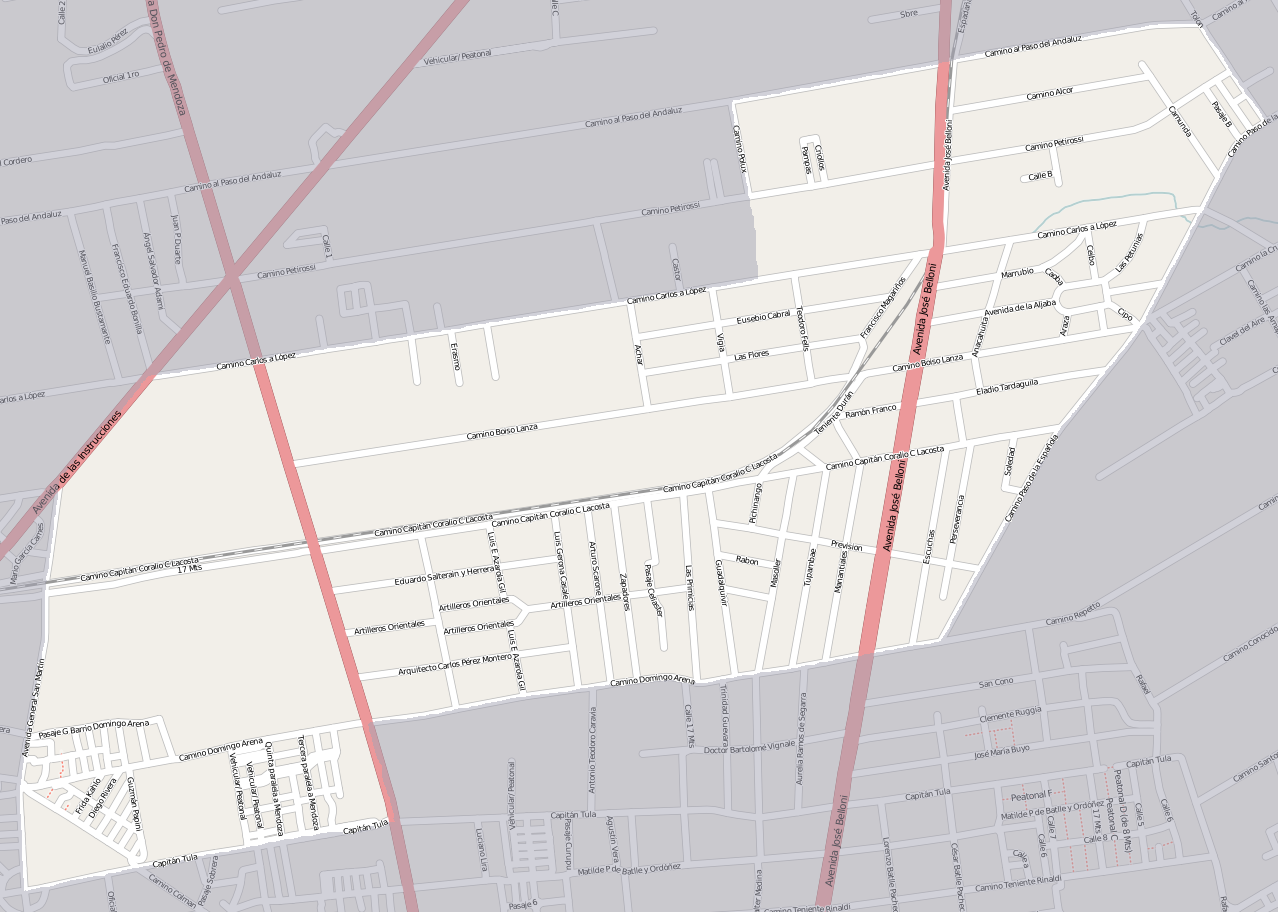
- Street map of Manga

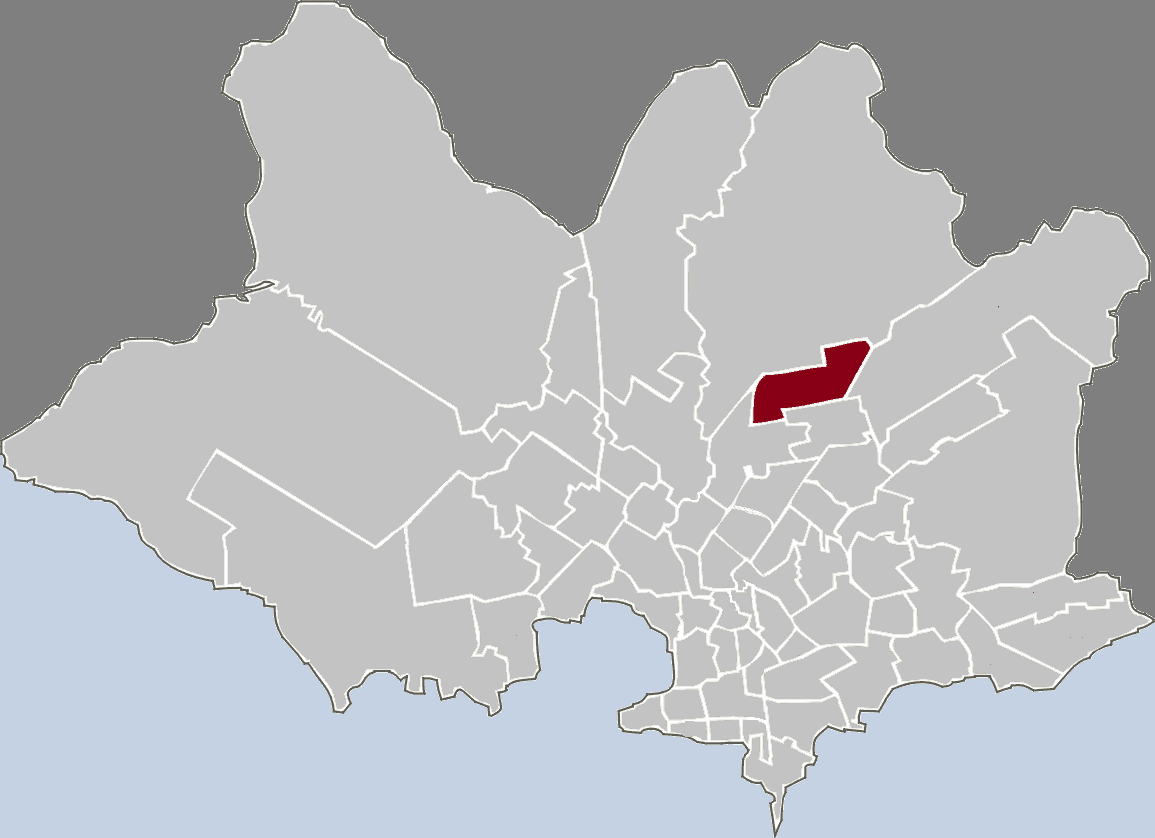
- Location of Manga in Montevideo
- Coordinates: 34°49′S 56°06′W
- Country: Uruguay
- Department: Montevideo Department
- City: Montevideo

Manga is a barrio (neighbourhood or district) of Montevideo, Uruguay.

== Location ==
Manga shares borders with Manga–Toledo Chico to the north and northwest, Villa García–Manga Rural to the east, Piedras Blancas to the south and Casavalle to the southwest.

== The Zone of "Mangangá" ==
The origin of the name "Manga" is believed to come from the short name of the word "Mangangá", name which appeared mentioned in 1780, the zone later called "Manga". According to Benito Tesore, expert in Manga's history and its men that subsisted in the zone in the first years of the century. Lot of trenches and strongholds were built, possibly to stop the Portuguese advance (in Artigas' times). Armed with this assumption, it could be why municipal authority gave names as "Trinchera" (Trenches) and "Fortín" (Fort) to two roads of the zone.

The first owner of a ranch in Manga was Esteban Artigas (Son of the captain Juan Antonio Artigas), ceded by The Government of Spain. In the Register Aldecoa, from 1772-1773, he's figured as living with his six under-age children in The Manga, then known as "Pago del Arroyo de Sierra" (Zone of the brook of Mountain Range), known by that name because of a neighbour's surname of the zone.

The farm "Mangafue"-it was called that way- was passing along years by different owners, one of them, Marcos Drapple, who, in February 1834, was offerin for sale to a Salting House called "Los Dos Hermanos" (The Two Brothers), located 3 ½ miles from Montevideo. The edification consisted of two buildings, one of sixteen rooms, a store, a slaughter, a "barn raised" for storing hides, tallow, wool and grains, and a large warehouse with eaves to desalinate; the other one with a wooden trellis to stack the meat, with four doors of ventilation and a stable.

According to "El Universal", it had good grazing lands and water, willow trees and quinces, and fencing to protect ten pitas acres of crops. In the grounds of Manga, put up for sale in January 1834, there were also two flourmills, a bricked oven with a pond and a footrest. The purchaser was Luis Fernández, and with his brother José, had been linked to the place for their activities, where they had been the late eighteenth century, a farm, grocery store and flourmill. Ownership of the farm was kept by Luis Fernandez after the death of José in 1819, inherited by Manuel Cifuentes, prestigious person in Cordón, where he was justice of the peace. In 1832, Cifuentes was designated by the Economic Administrative Board of the Department of Montevideo to integrate the Public Education Committee of Extramural, together with Matías Tort and Pedro Pablo de la Sierra. In the period 1839-1841 he was a member of that such Board and years later, in 1863, after having resided in the Manga with his family during so-called Guerra Grande (Great War), he was invited to join the communal body as a backup to Félix Buxareo.

== Places of worship ==
- Parish Church of Our Lady of Mt. Carmel (Roman Catholic)

== See also ==
- Barrios of Montevideo
