= Manga – Toledo Chico =

Manga
- Barrio
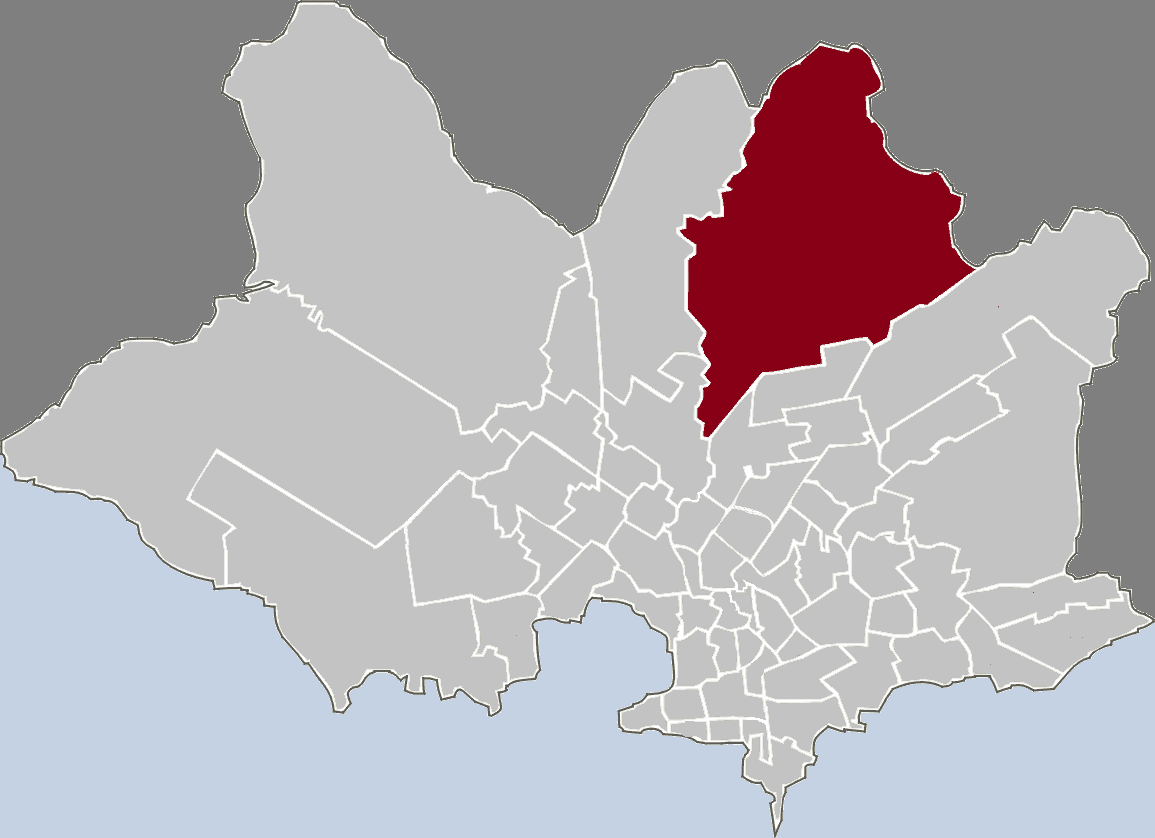
- Location of Manga, Toledo Chico in Montevideo

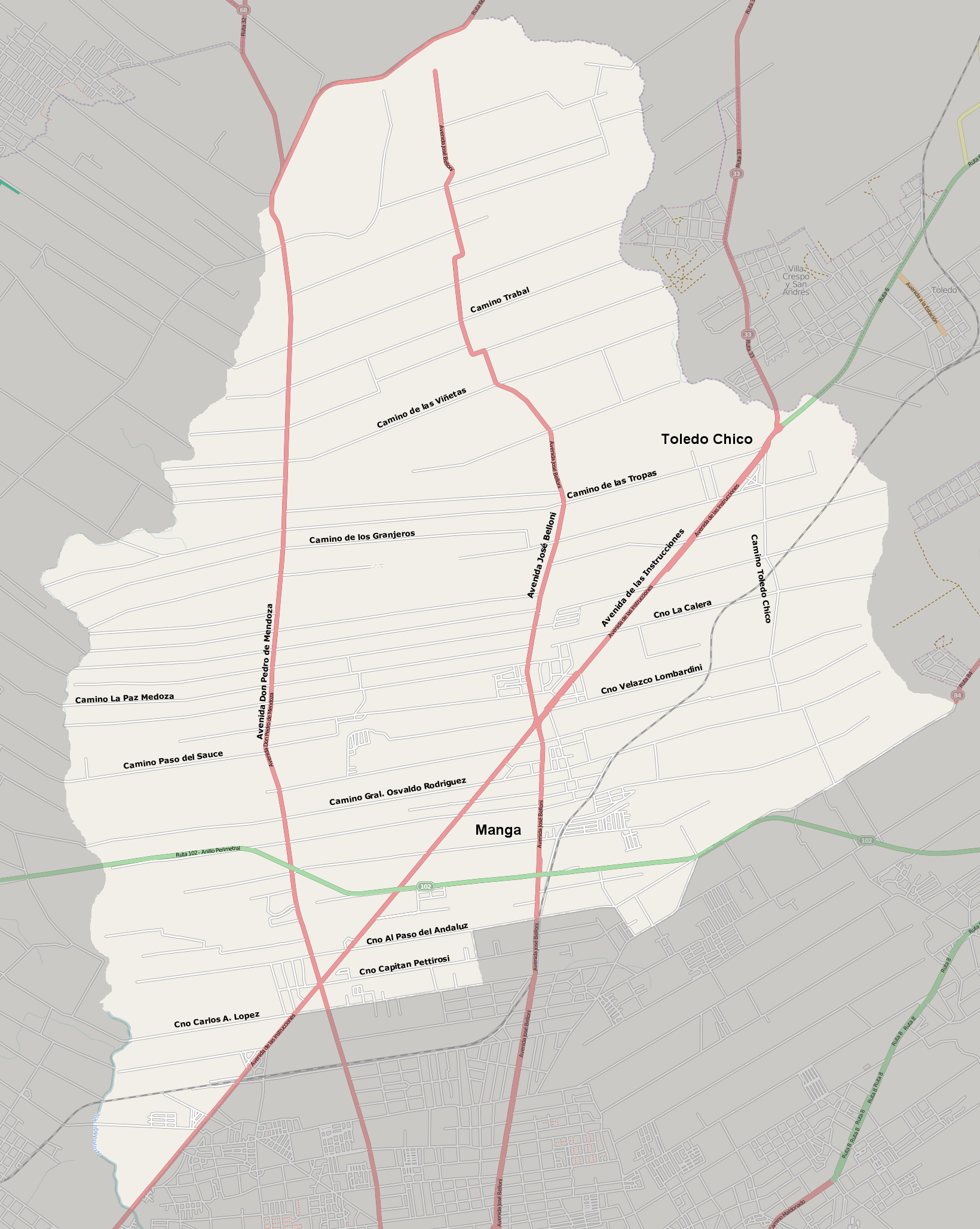
- Plan of Manga, Toledo Chico
- Country: Uruguay
- Department: Montevideo Department
- City: Montevideo

Manga – Toledo Chico is a composite barrio (neighbourhood or district) of Montevideo, Uruguay.

== Location ==
This barrio borders Colón Sudeste to the west, Canelones Department to the north and east, Peñarol, Casavalle, Manga, and Villa García to the south.

== See also ==
- Barrios of Montevideo
