= Peñarol (disambiguation) =

Peñarol is a sports club based in Montevideo, Uruguay, mostly known for its football section, Club Atlético Peñarol.

Peñarol (or Penarol) may also refer to:

- Club Atlético Peñarol Basketball, the senior men's basketball section of the club
- Peñarol Rugby, the professional rugby union section of the club, that competes in Súper Liga Americana de Rugby
- Peñarol, Montevideo, a barrio (administrative district) of Montevideo, where the club is based
- Club Atlético Argentino Peñarol, a football club based in Córdoba, Argentina
- Peñarol de Mar del Plata, an Argentine basketball team
- Penarol Atlético Clube, a football club based in Itacoatiara, Amazonas, Brazil
- Halcones FC, a football club based in Huehuetenango, Guatemala, known as Peñarol La Mesilla until 2012
- Peñarol Sport Club, a football club based in Fortaleza, Ceará, Brazil
