= Barrios of Montevideo =

The city of Montevideo, capital of Uruguay, is divided into 62 barrios (neighborhoods or districts), each with its own identity, demographic characteristics and activities appropriate to the socio-cultural level of its inhabitants. The outer barrios of Montevideo are largely rural.

In a more general usage of the word barrio, some people refer to the biggest large-scale residential complexes of Montevideo as barrios, although they do not appear as such in official lists. Such are the Parque Posadas in Aires Puros, the Euskal Erría complexes in Malvin Norte and others.

Many areas of the city that are now considered barrios had geographically independent populations that were later absorbed into the growing city. This is the case with Sayago, Pocitos, Carrasco and others. Some barrios grew out of industrial areas, such as Cerro and Nuevo París. Other areas that were considered distinct barrios have been subsumed into larger barrios. Such is the barrio Goes, most of which has been incorporated in Villa Muñoz, while smaller parts of it were incorporated in Aguada and La Figurita, the barrio Arroyo Seco which has been incorporated in Bella Vista, the Barrio Borro, Retiro and others. As a consequence, different maps may show differences in the number and the borders of some barrios. This list and its accompanying map follow the division in barrios of the National Statistics Institute of Uruguay.

== List of barrios ==
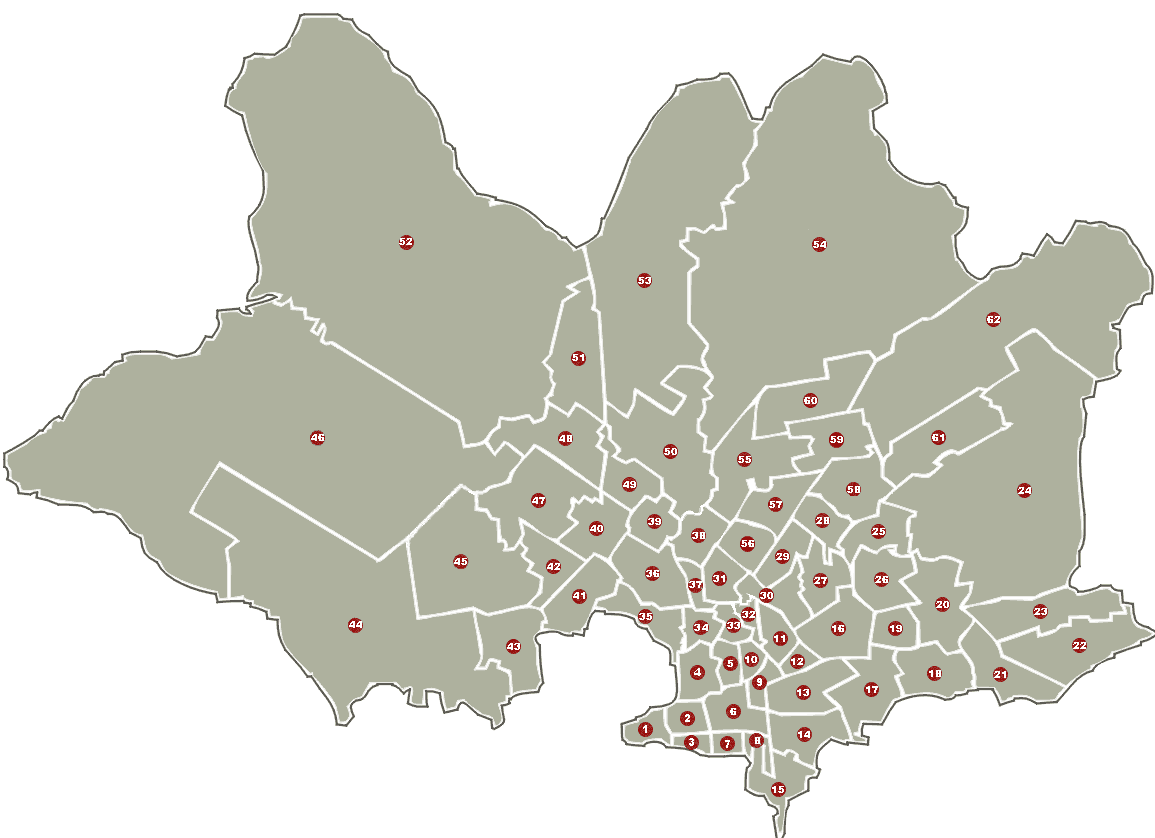
Map of Montevideo

1. Ciudad Vieja
2. Centro
3. Barrio Sur
4. Aguada
5. Villa Muñoz–Retiro, Goes
6. Cordón
7. Palermo
8. Parque Rodó
9. Tres Cruces
10. La Comercial
11. Larrañaga
12. La Blanqueada
13. Parque Batlle–Villa Dolores
14. Pocitos
15. Punta Carretas
16. Unión
17. Buceo
18. Malvín
19. Malvín Norte
20. Las Canteras
21. Punta Gorda
22. Carrasco
23. Carrasco Norte
24. Bañados de Carrasco
25. Flor de Maroñas
26. Maroñas–Parque Guaraní
27. Villa Española
28. Ituzaingó
29. Castro–Pérez Castellanos
30. Mercado Modelo, Bolívar
31. Brazo Oriental
32. Jacinto Vera
33. La Figurita
34. Reducto
35. Capurro–Bella Vista, Arroyo Seco
36. Prado–Nueva Savona
37. Atahualpa
38. Aires Puros
39. Paso de las Duranas
40. Belvedere
41. La Teja
42. Tres Ombúes–Pueblo Victoria
43. Villa del Cerro
44. Casabó–Pajas Blancas
45. La Paloma–Tomkinson
46. Paso de la Arena–Santiago Vázquez
47. Nuevo París, Islas Canarias
48. Conciliación–Sayago Norte, Verdisol
49. Sayago
50. Peñarol–Lavalleja
51. Colón Centro y Noroeste
52. Lezica–Melilla
53. Colón Sudeste–Abayubá
54. Manga–Toledo Chico
55. Casavalle
56. Cerrito de la Victoria
57. Las Acacias
58. Jardines del Hipódromo
59. Piedras Blancas
60. Manga
61. Punta de Rieles – Bella Italia
62. Villa García–Manga Rural

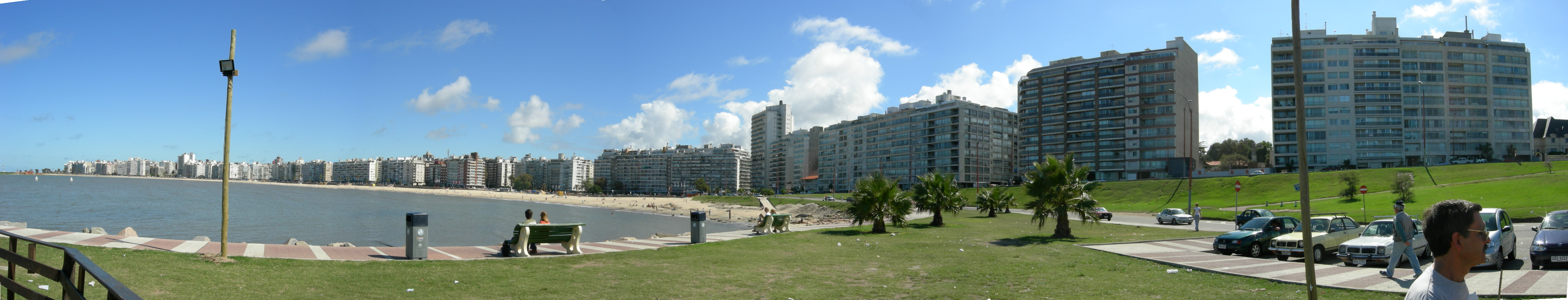
Montevideo, Pocitos Neighborhood
