= Cerrito, Montevideo =

Cerrito de la Victoria
- Barrio
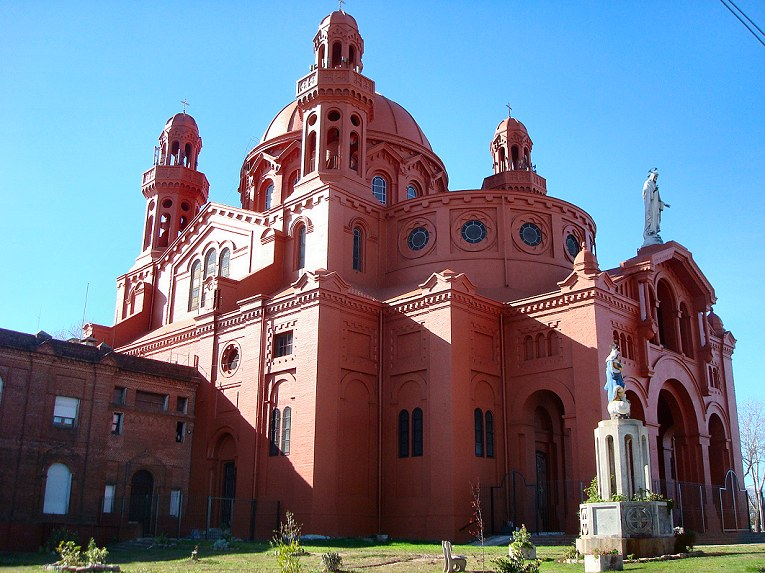

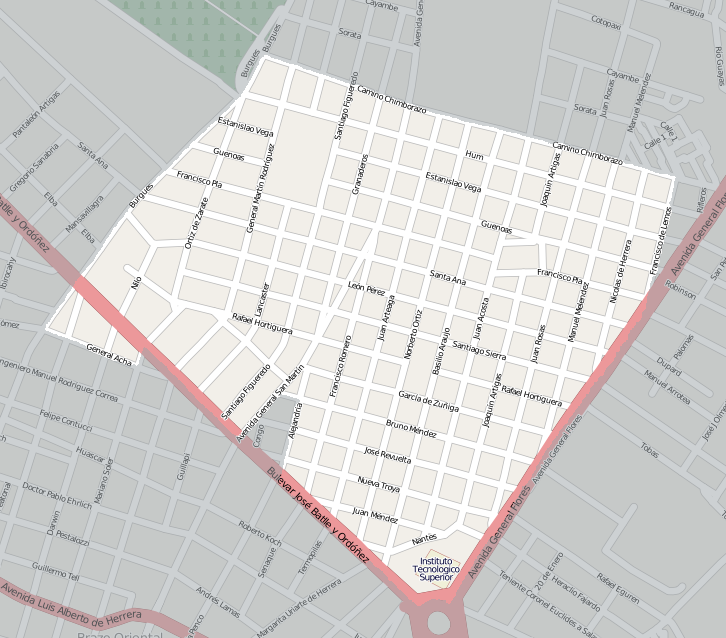
- Street map of Cerrito de la Victoria

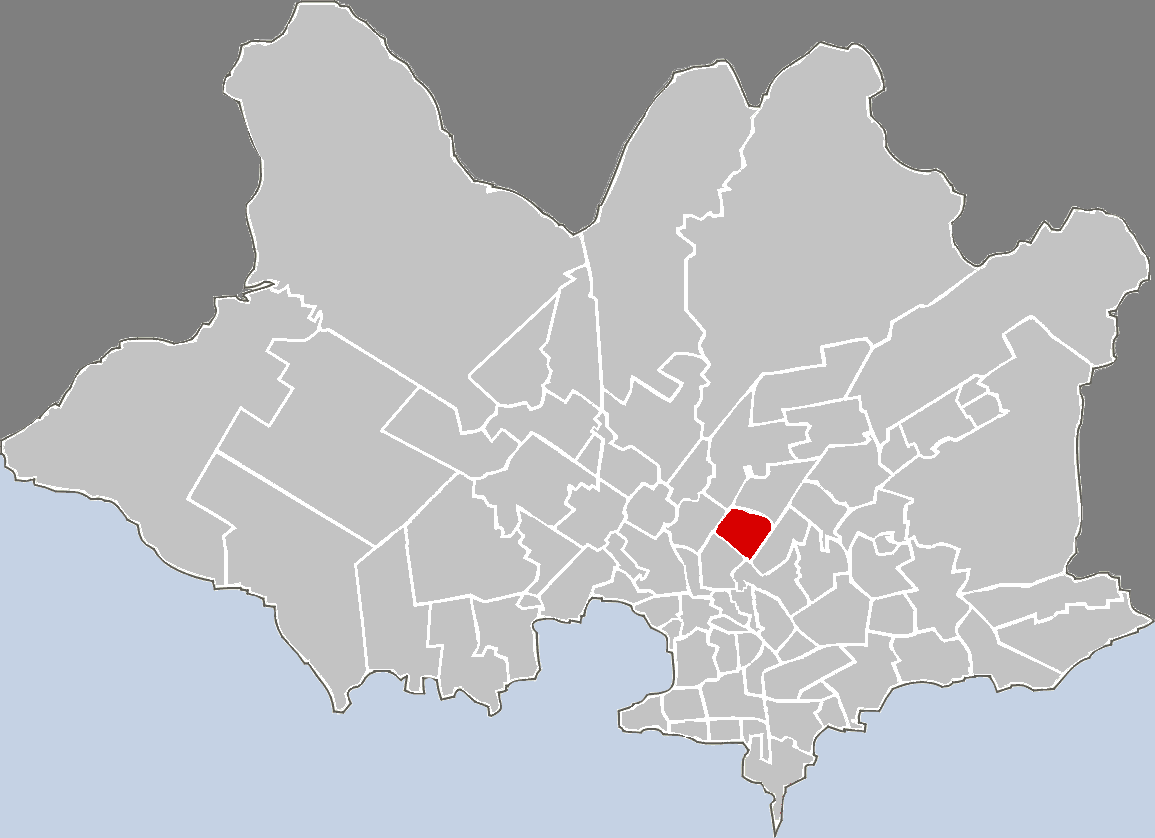
- Location of Cerrito in Montevideo
- Coordinates: 34°51′23″S 56°10′9″W
- Country: Uruguay
- Department: Montevideo Department
- City: Montevideo

Cerrito, officially Cerrito de la Victoria, is a barrio (neighbourhood or district) of Montevideo, Uruguay. Most of the barrio is on a hill (cerrito is Spanish for "hill") on which is the church named Santuario Nacional del Cerrito. This hill was the seat of the temporary government of General Oribe during his siege of Montevideo.

== Location ==
Cerrito de la Victoria borders Aires Puros to the west, Las Acacias to the north, Pérez Castellanos to the east, Bolívar and Brazo Oriental to the south.

== Places of worship ==
- National Shrine of the Heart of Jesus (Roman Catholic)
- Parish Church of Our Lady of the Thirty-Three (Roman Catholic)

== Sport ==
The neighbourhood has two sports clubs, who share a large rivalry; the Clásico del Cerrito is contested between Club Sportivo Cerrito and Rentistas.

== See also ==
- Barrios of Montevideo
- Gobierno del Cerrito
