= Mercado Modelo (Montevideo) =

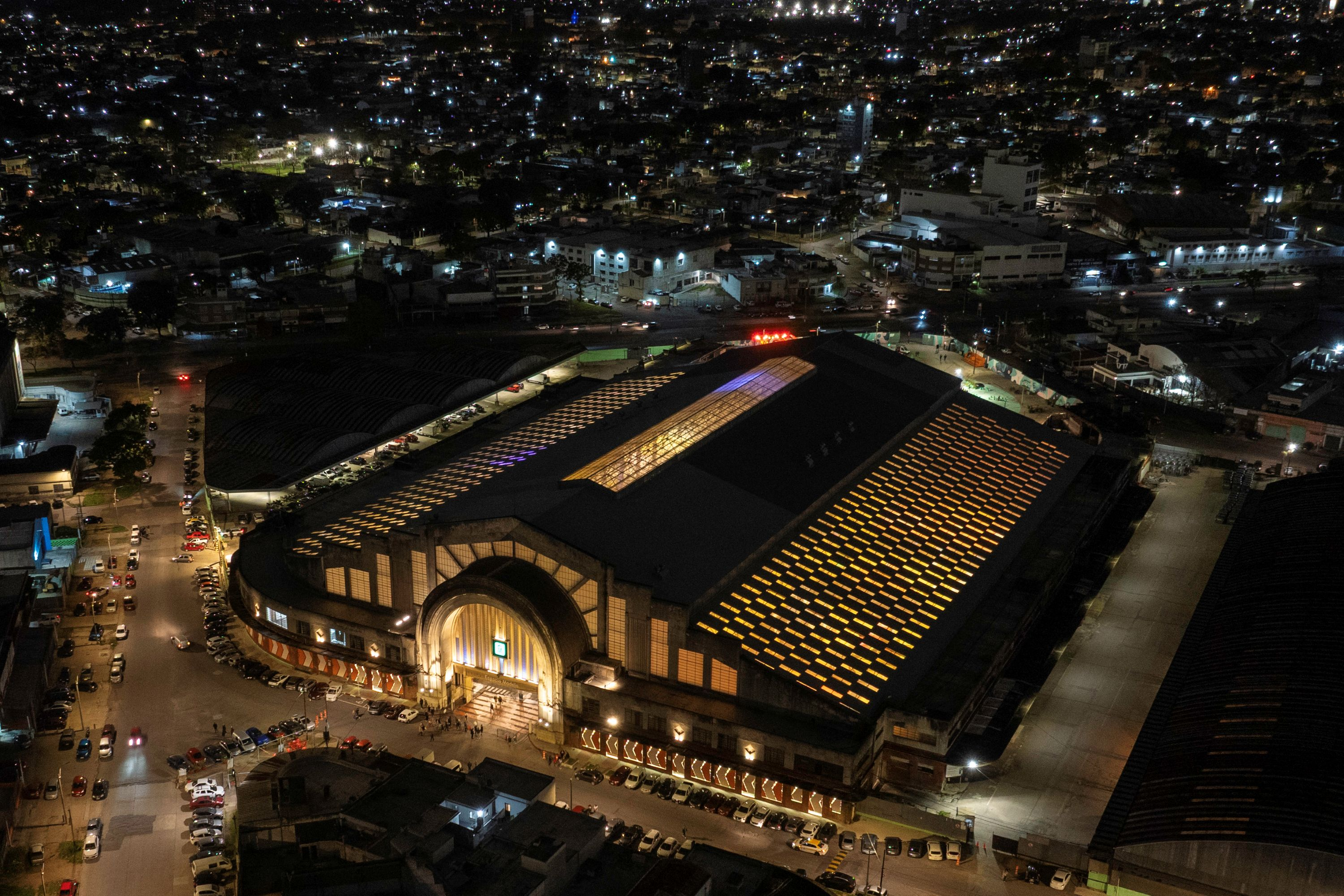
Air view of the historic landmark Mercado Modelo, turned into an entertainment center with the name Espacio Modelo.

Mercado Modelo was the central municipal fruit and vegetable wholesale market in of Montevideo, Uruguay. The area around the installations, which occupy several blocks of the Mercado Modelo–Bolívar barrio, has also taken on the name of the market, hence the composite name of the entire barrio. The central building has an area of 19,000 square metres (200,000 sq ft), to which more buildings were added in 1996 of an area of 15,000 square metres (160,000 sq ft), while the overall area of the market is 70,000 square metres (750,000 sq ft).

In March 2009, the then mayor of Montevideo, Ricardo Ehrlich, announced that the market would be moved to the west of Montevideo. In 2024 the former market was reinaugurated as an entertainment center with cowork, sports and food areas, under the denomination Espacio Modelo.

== See also ==
- Bolívar, Montevideo
