= Malvín Norte =

- Barrio
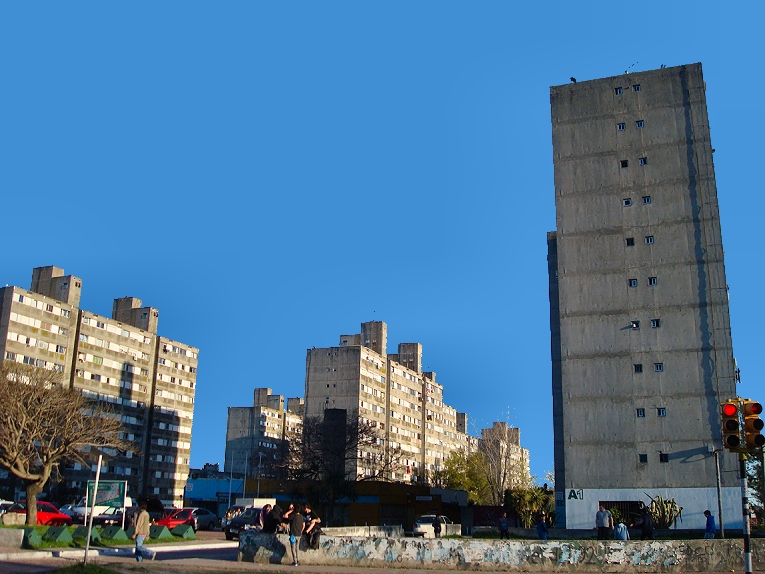
- The apartment complex Euskalerria 92

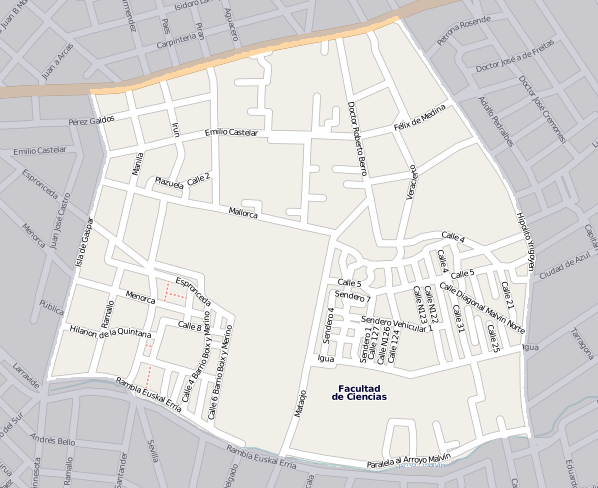
- Street map of Malvín Norte

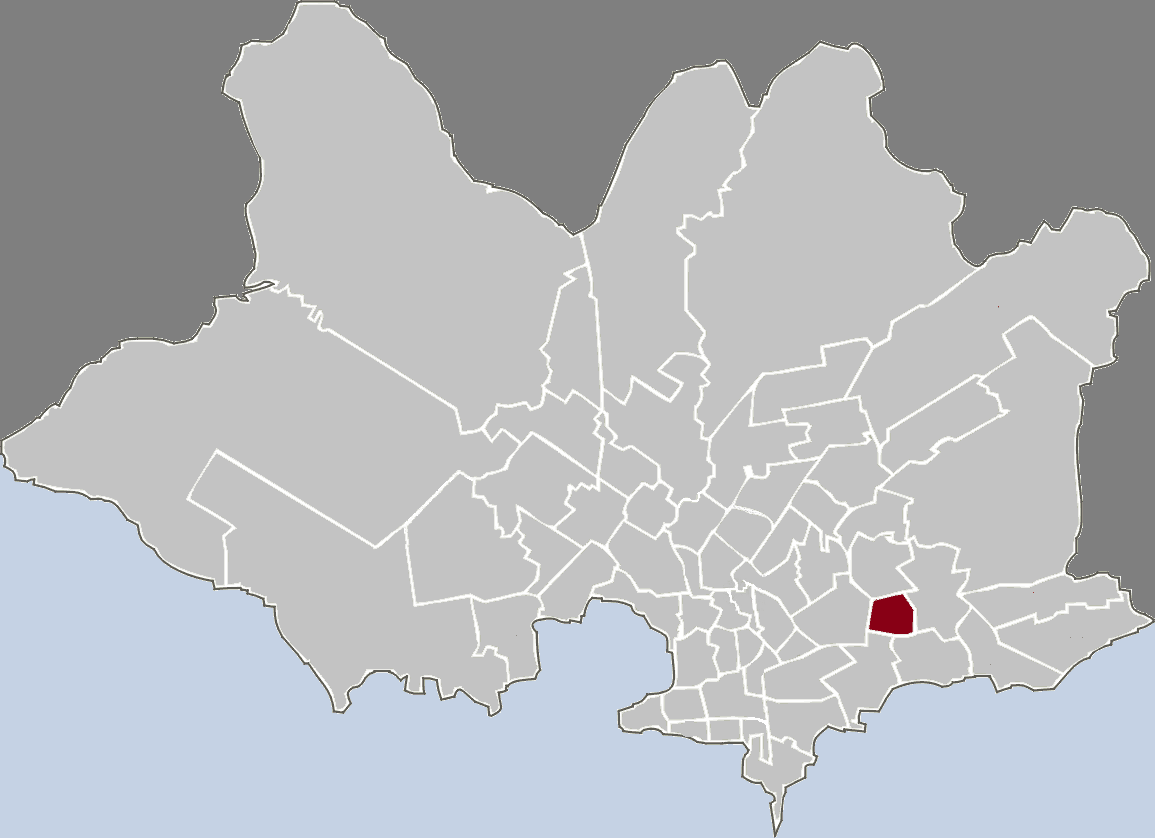
- Location of Malvín Norte in Montevideo
- Coordinates: 34°52′46″S 56°7′10″W
- Country: Uruguay
- Department: Montevideo Department
- City: Montevideo

Malvín Norte is a barrio (neighbourhood or district) located in north eastern part of Montevideo, Uruguay.

== Location ==
This barrio shares borders with Unión to the west, Maroñas to the north, Las Canteras to the east, Malvín and Buceo to the south.

== History ==
The neighborhood was the site of a multiyear conflict in 1987-1992 about the emissions of lead-contaminated smoke from the Gonzalez Hemanos S.A. metal smelters.

== Landmarks ==
It is home to the Faculty of Sciences of the University of the Republic of Uruguay.

== See also ==
- Barrios of Montevideo
