= Maroñas =

Maroñas–Parque Guaraní
- Barrio
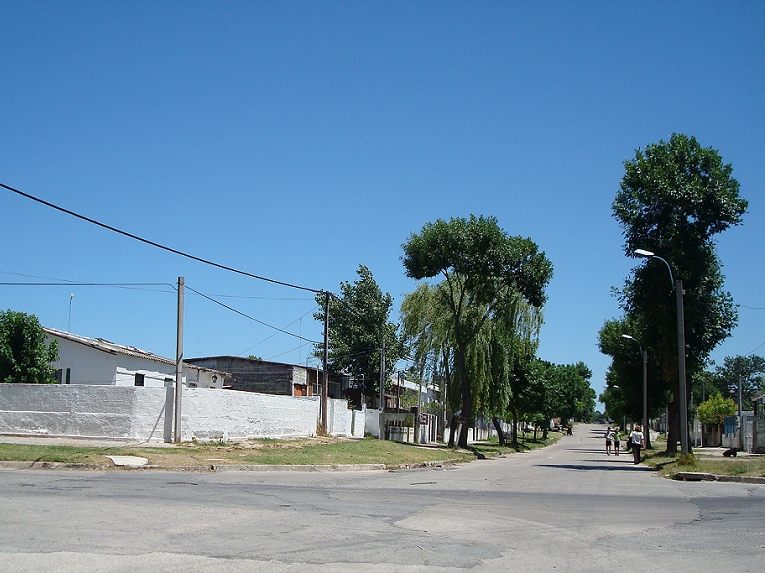
- A street in Maroñas

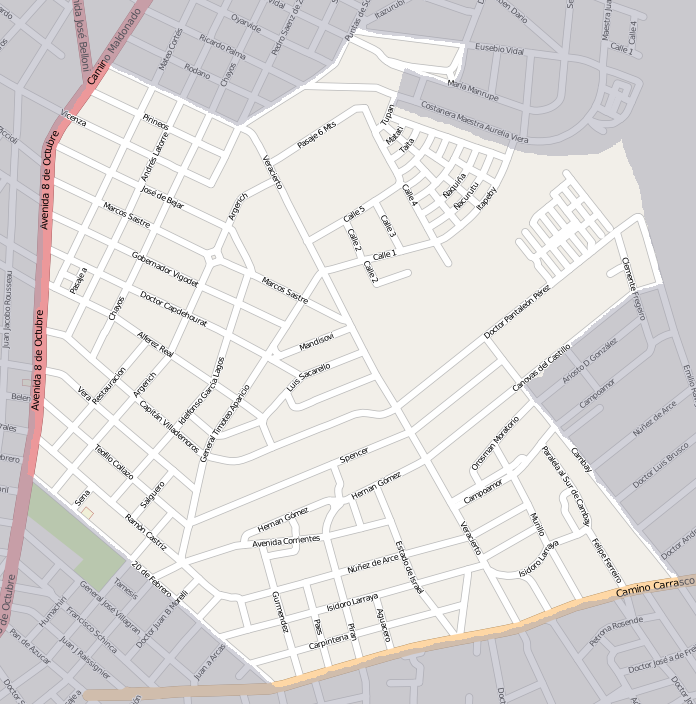
- Street map of Maroñas–Parque Guaraní

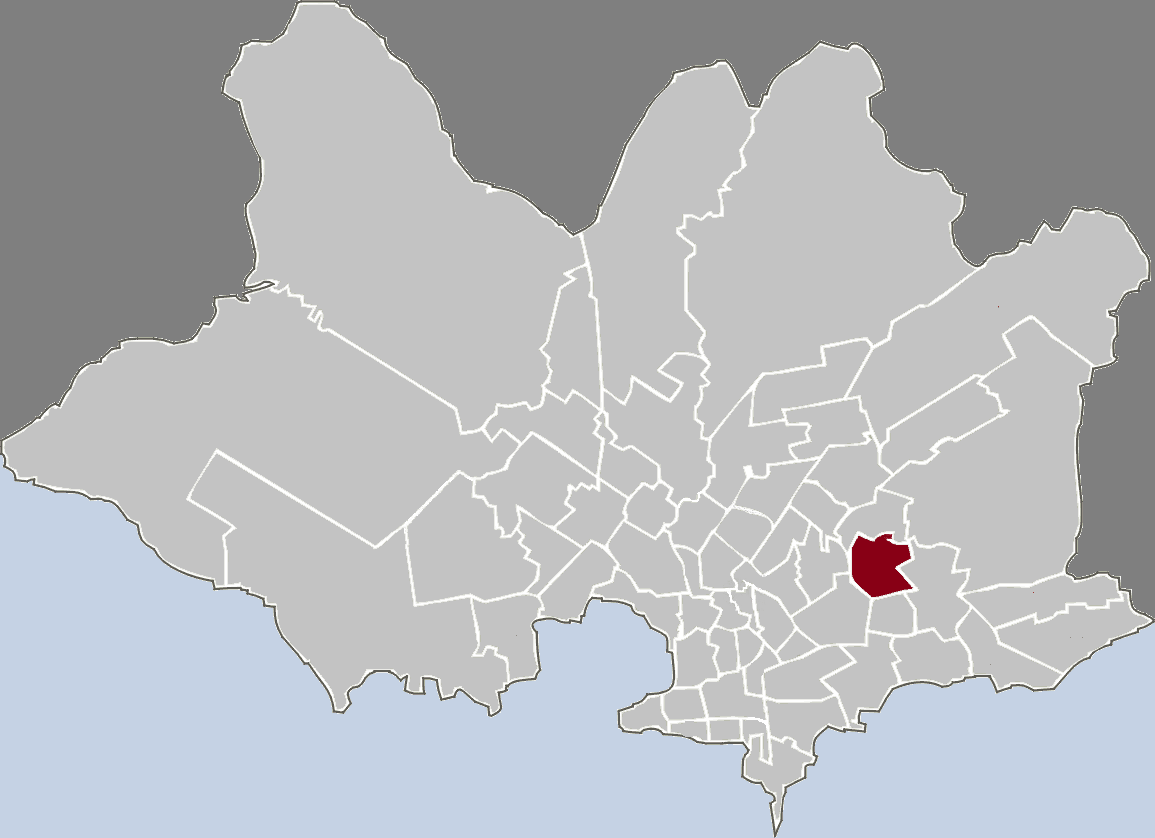
- Location of Maroñas–Parque Guaraní in Montevideo
- Coordinates: 34°51′48″S 56°7′46″W
- Country: Uruguay
- Department: Montevideo Department
- City: Montevideo

Maroñas–Parque Guaraní is a composite barrio (neighbourhood or district) of Montevideo.

== Location ==
This barrio shares borders with Unión to the southwest, Villa Española to the west, Flor de Maroñas to the north, Las Canteras to the east and Malvín Norte to the south. It is a suburban area which has only one main street called Camino Maldonado. This street is surrounded by small businesses and is the main route to travel to some of the departments of Uruguay.

== Images ==
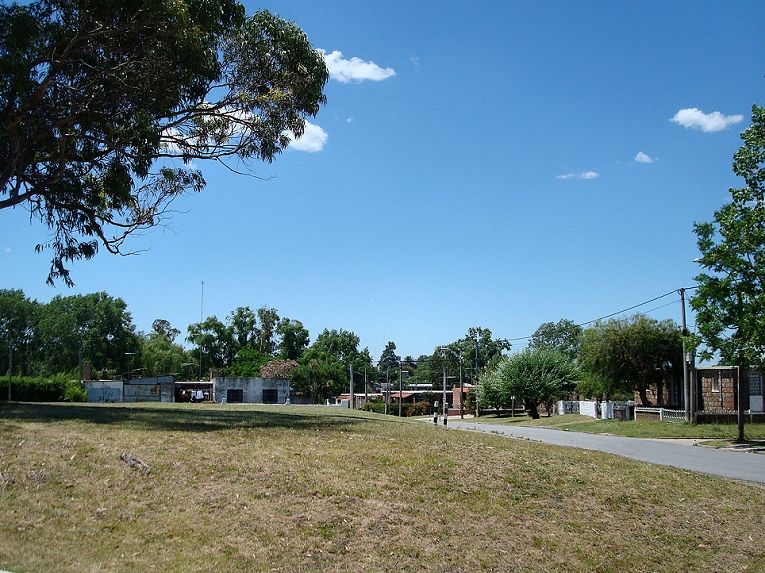
The central square of Parque Guaraní.

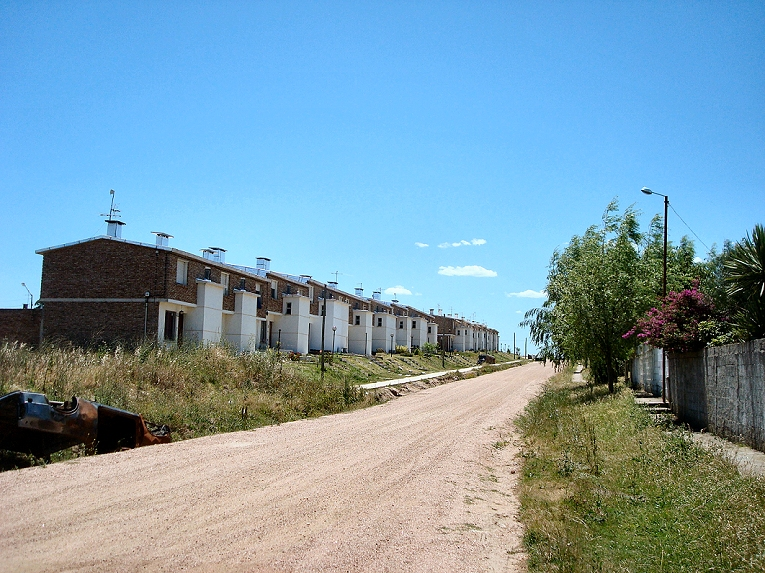
New residential complex in Parque Guaraní.

== See also ==
- Barrios of Montevideo
