= Unión, Montevideo =

Unión
- Neighbourhood
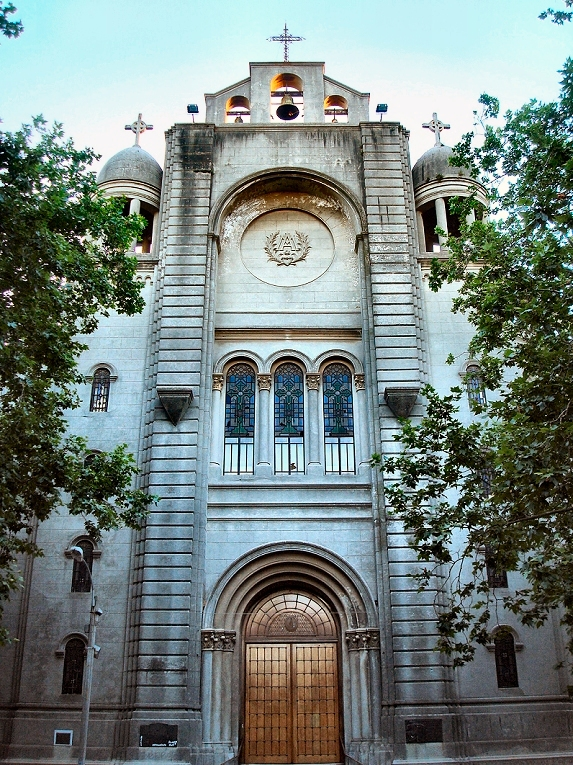
- Iglesia de la Unión

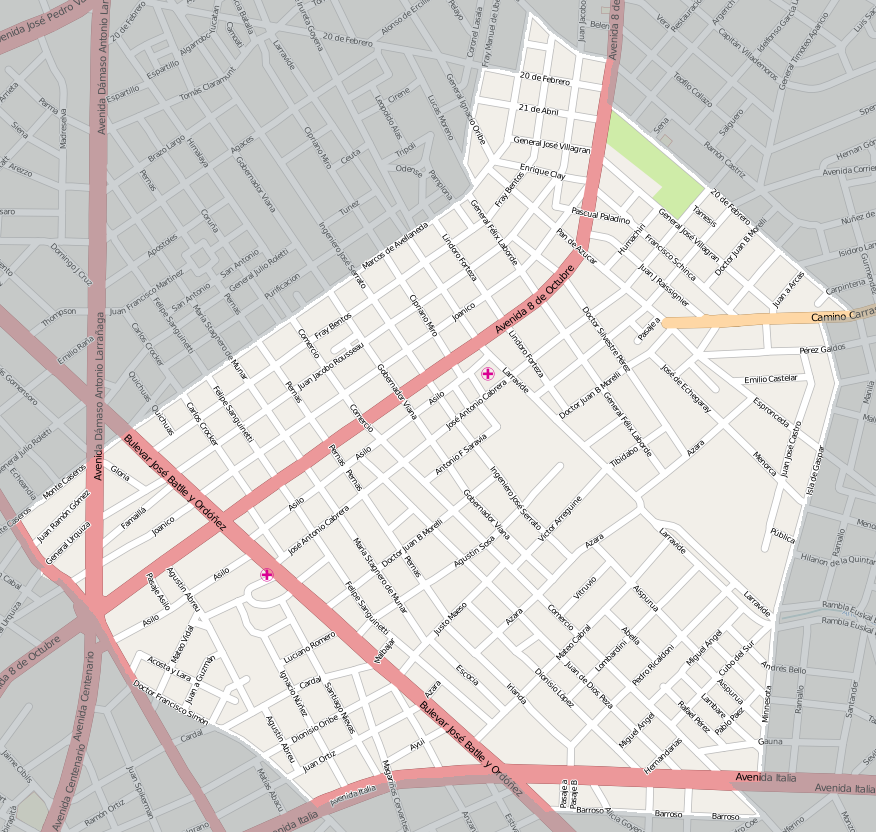
- Street map of Unión

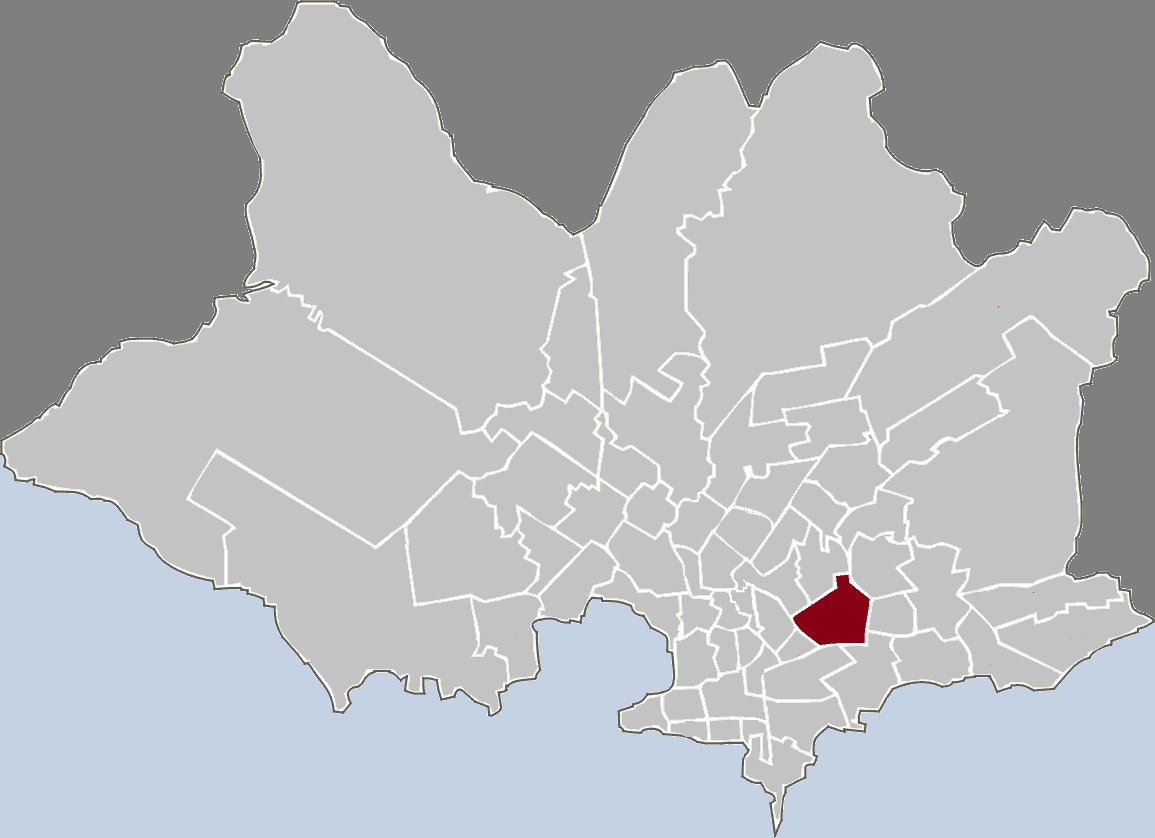
- Location of Unión in Montevideo
- Coordinates: 34°52′43″S 56°8′9″W
- Country: Uruguay
- Department: Montevideo Department
- City: Montevideo

Unión is a neighbourhood of Montevideo, Uruguay.

== Location ==
Unión shares borders with Bolívar and Villa Española to the northwest, Maroñas to the northeast, Malvín Norte to the east, Buceo and Parque Batlle to the south and La Blanqueada and Larrañaga to the southwest.

== History ==
Unión's history started in 1845, during General Oribe's siege of Montevideo, which at the time was little more than the actual Ciudad Vieja, by the creation of the Tribunal of Unión in the area. In 1849, Oribe founded here a village called "Restauración". After the end of the civil war, its status was elevated from "Pueblo" (village) to "Villa" (town), which was renamed to "Villa de la Unión" by Decree of 11 November 1851.

== Educational facilities ==
- Colegio y Liceo Santa Luisa de Marillac (private, established 1919 by the Vicentian Sisters, lay since 1993)

== Places of worship ==
- Sanctuary of the Miraculous Medal and St. Augustine, popularly known as "Iglesia de la Unión" (Roman Catholic, Congregation of the Mission)
- Parish Church of Our Lady of Mt. Carmel and St. Cajetan (Roman Catholic)
- Parish Church of St. Joseph the Worker (Roman Catholic)

== Bibliography ==
- Assunção, Fernando O.; Bombet Franco, Iris (1991). La Unión. Cuadernos del Boston (in Spanish). Vol. 3. Montevideo.

== See also ==
- Barrios of Montevideo
