= Santuario de la Medalla Milagrosa y San Agustín, Montevideo =

Roman Catholic parish church in Montevideo, Uruguay

Coordinates: 34°52′32.4″S 56°8′22.4″W

Santuario de la Medalla Milagrosa y San Agustín
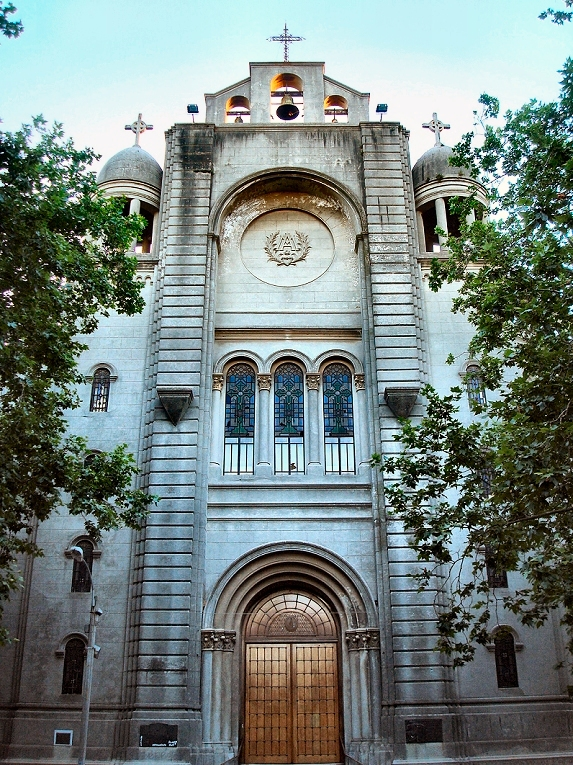

Religion
- Affiliation: Roman Catholic
- Ecclesiastical or organizational status: Parish church
- Year consecrated: 1930

Location
- Location: Domingo Ereño 2465; Montevideo, Uruguay
- Interactive map of Santuario de la Medalla Milagrosa y San Agustín

The Sanctuary of the Miraculous Medal and Saint Augustine (Spanish: Santuario de la Medalla Milagrosa y San Agustín), popularly known as Iglesia de la Unión (due to its location in the neighbourhood of La Unión) is a Roman Catholic parish church in Montevideo, Uruguay.

== History ==
The parish was established on 12 October 1849, during the Guerra Grande.

In 1896, bishop Mariano Soler blessed the fundamental stone; but the construction of the building took decades, being consecrated in 1930. It has been a landmark of this neighbourhood ever since.

Held by the Congregation of the Mission, it is dedicated to Saint Augustine and the Immaculate Virgin Mary of the Miraculous Medal. Cardinal Antonio Barbieri was decisive in this dedication; now the sanctuary is a shrine of pilgrimage. Furthermore, in 1975 it was declared a National Monument.

The Montevideo Philharmonic Orchestra holds concerts here during its seasons.

== Same devotion ==
There is another church in Uruguay dedicated to the Miraculous Medal:

- Our Lady of the Miraculous Medal Parish Church in San Isidro, near Las Piedras
