= Santuario Nacional del Corazón de Jesús, Montevideo =

Coordinates: 34°51′24.5″S 56°10′12″W

Cerrito Church
- National Shrine of the Sacred Heart of Jesus
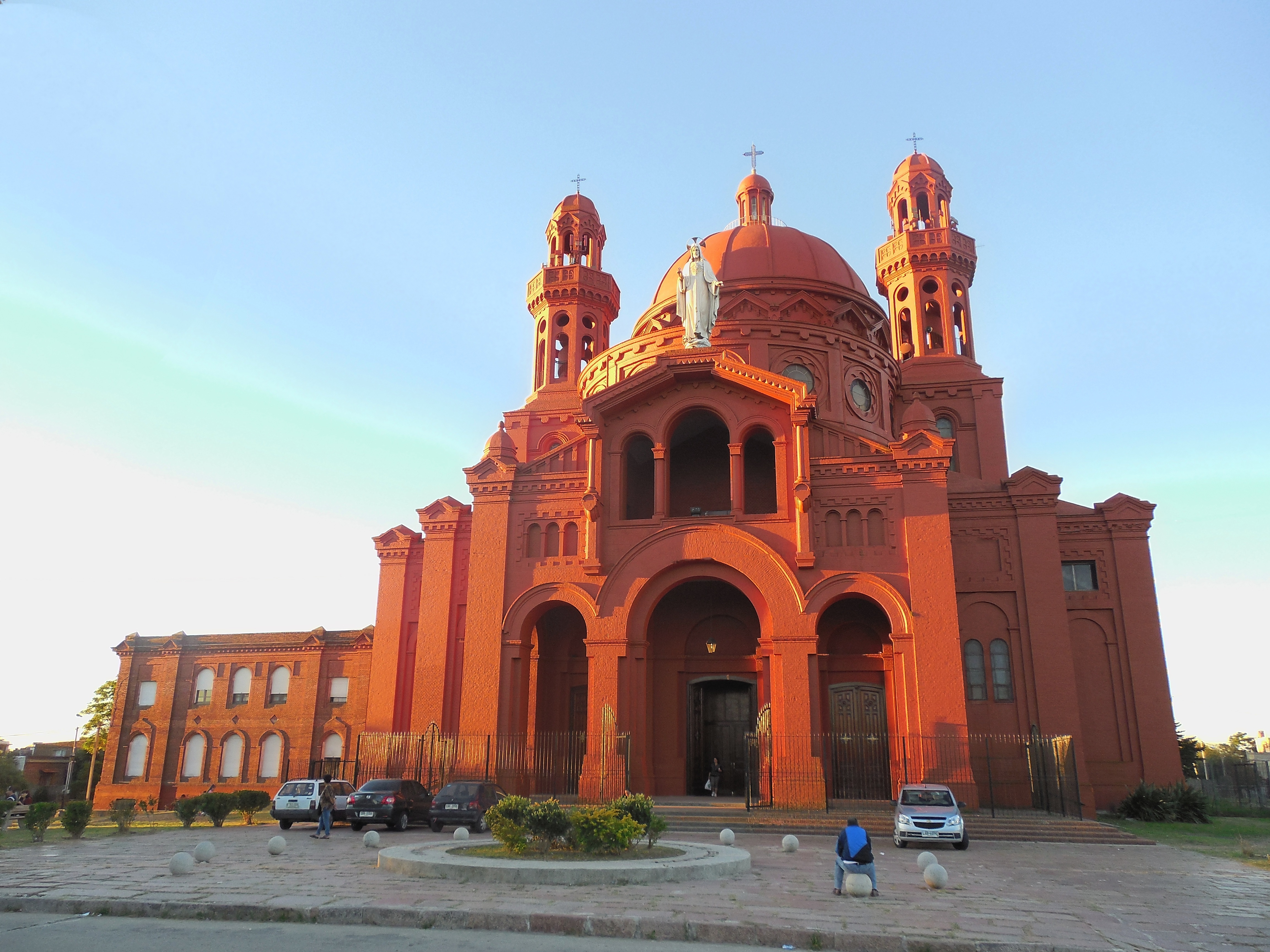
- Cerrito Church
- Location: Cerrito, Montevideo
- Address: Bruno Mendez 3880
- Country: Uruguay
- Denomination: Roman Catholic

History
- Founded: 1919
- Dedication: Sacred Heart of Jesus

Architecture
- Architect(s): Ernesto Vespignani; Elzeario Boix; Horacio Terra Arocena
- Style: Neo-Byzantine
- Completed: 1926

The National Shrine of the Sacred Heart of Jesus (Spanish: Santuario Nacional del Sagrado Corazón de Jesús), popularly known as Iglesia del Cerrito (due to its location on top of the Cerrito de la Victoria) is a Roman Catholic parish church and national shrine in Montevideo, Uruguay.

== Overview ==
The building is inspired in the Sacré-Cœur, Paris with some influences of Hagia Sophia, Constantinople; it bears a free interpretation of the Byzantine style, but built in brick. Its situation on top of the Cerrito hill makes it one of the most notable landmarks in the Montevidean cityscape.

This temple is a National Sanctuary since 1898, as established by Archbishop Mariano Soler. Later, the parish was established on 30 October 1919.
