= Bolívar, Montevideo =

Bolívar
- Barrio
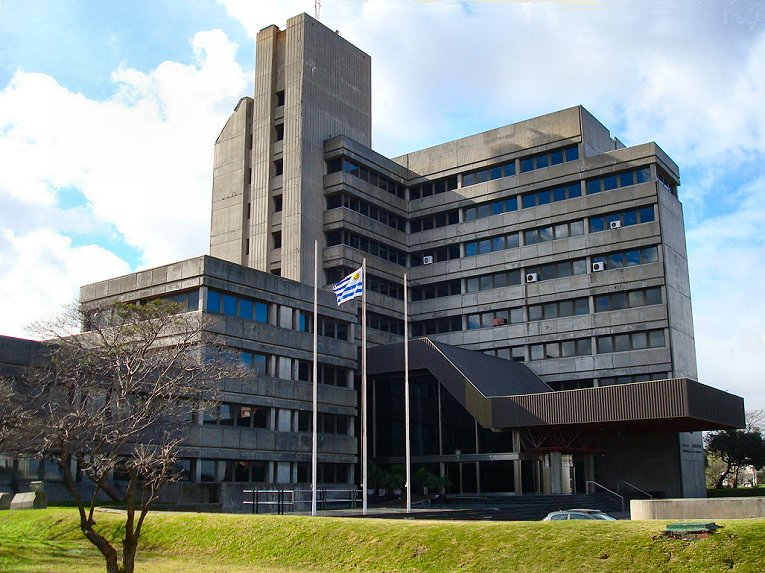
- Liberty Building, Bolívar

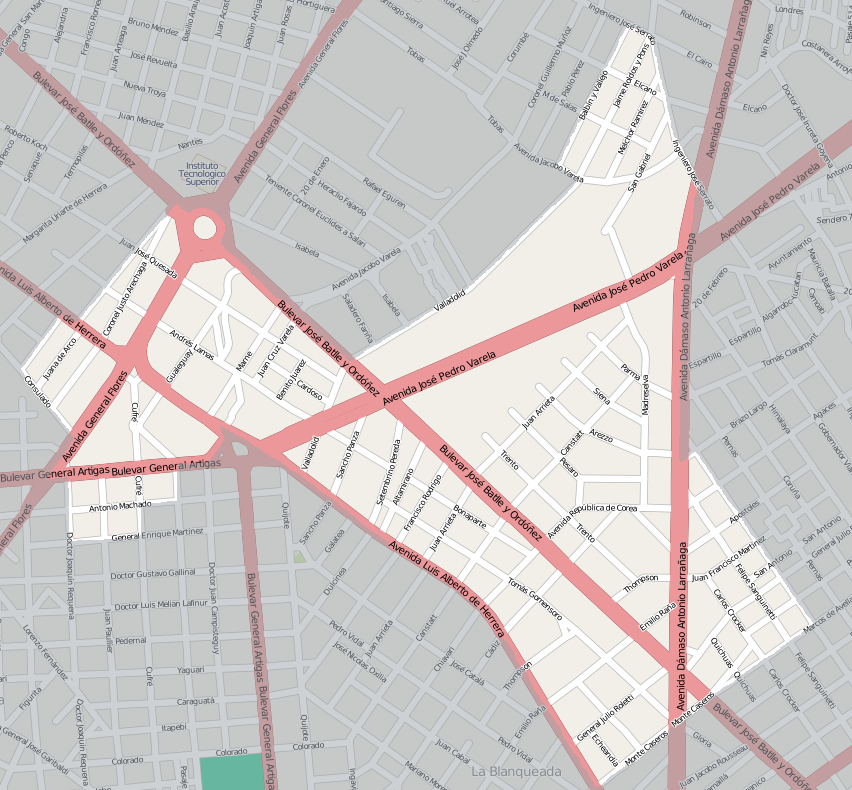
- Street map of Bolívar - Mercado Modelo

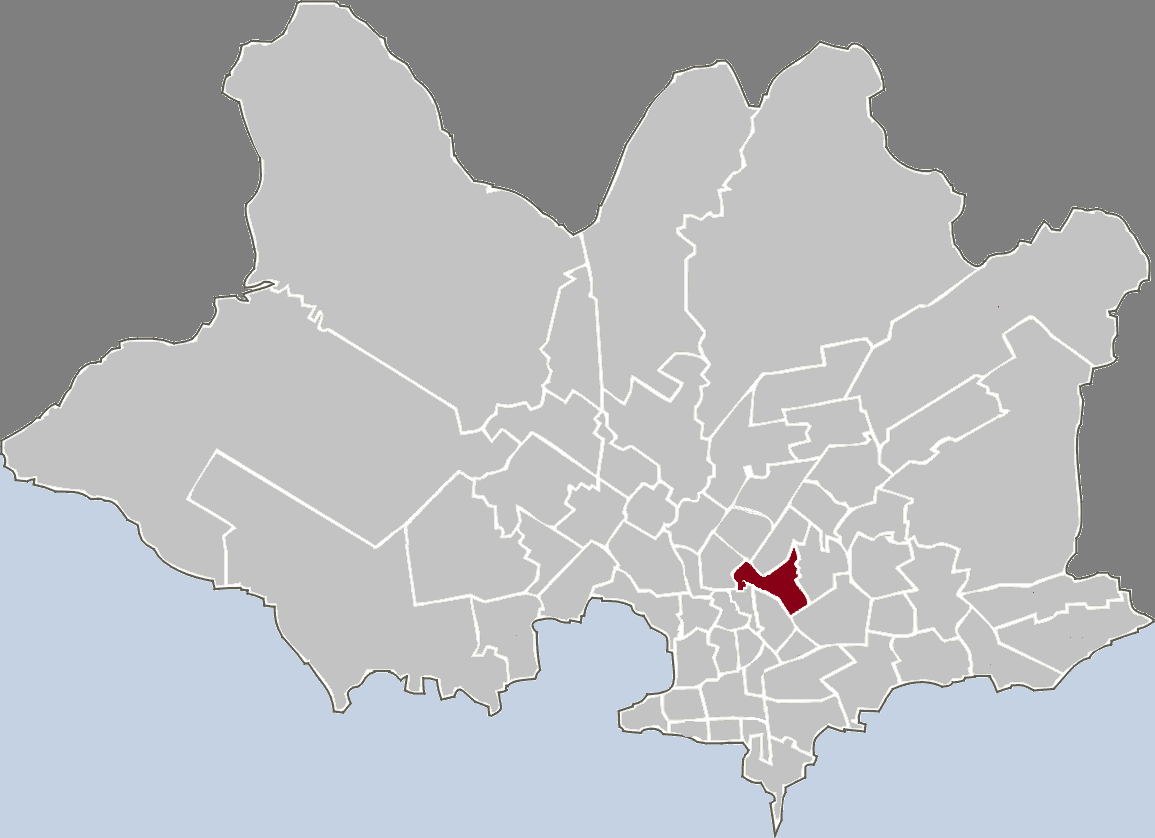
- Location of Bolívar - Mercado Modelo in Montevideo
- Coordinates: 34°52′6″S 56°9′58″W
- Country: Uruguay
- Department: Montevideo Department
- City: Montevideo

Bolívar is a barrio (neighbourhood or district) of Montevideo, Uruguay, also known as Mercado Modelo–Bolívar.

== Location ==
Bolívar shares borders with Brazo Oriental to the northwest, Cerrito to the north, Pérez Castellanos to the northeast, Unión to the southeast, Jacinto Vera to the south.

It is site to the Liberty Building and the Parque de las Esculturas, a park with a permanent display of modern sculptures.

The barrio is home to the Mercado Modelo, a formed market hall, as well as to several big cold storage units, such as the Frigorifico Modelo and the Frigorifico Uruguayo. The former market was refurbished to a popular entertainment center.

== Educational facilities ==
- Colegio y Liceo Corazón de María (private, Roman Catholic, Franciscan Sisters of Christ the King)

== Places of worship ==
- Church of the Holy Apostles (Roman Catholic, Pallottine Fathers)

== See also ==
- Barrios of Montevideo

== Images ==
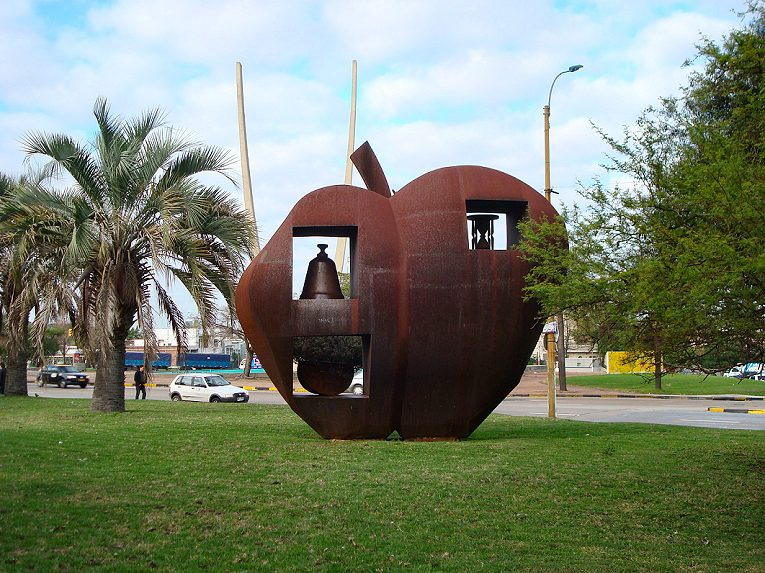

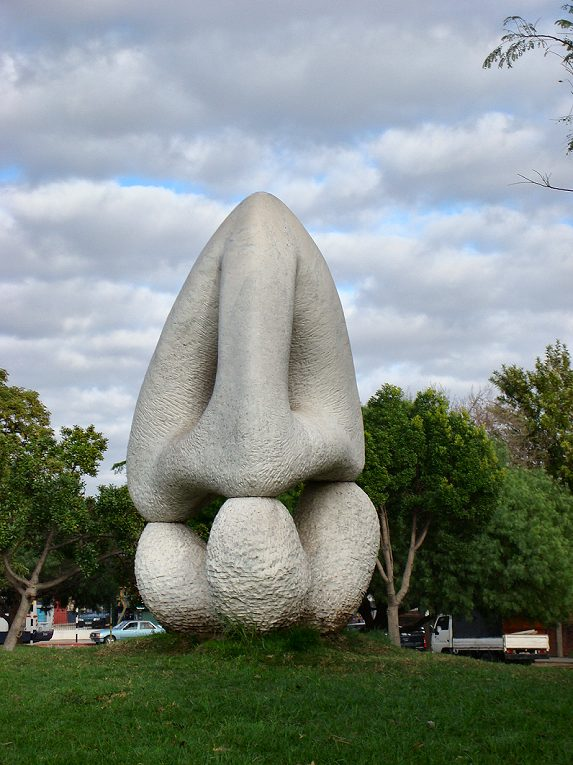
Parque de las Esculturas

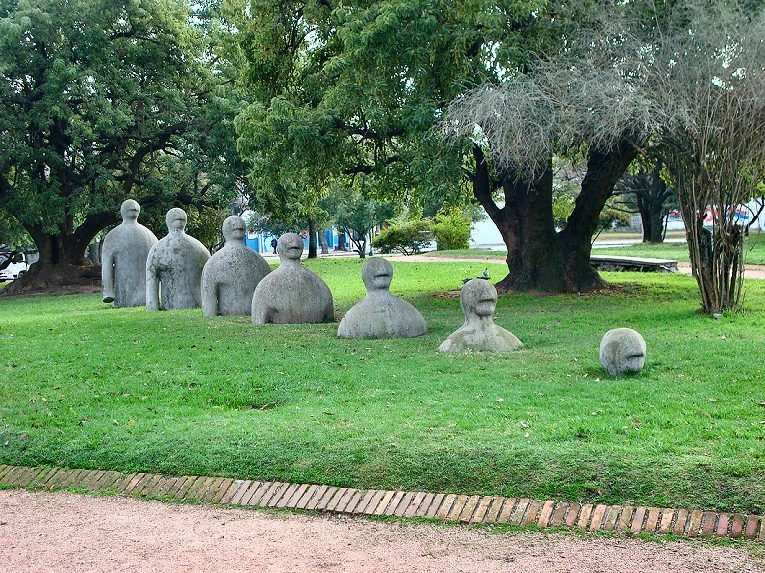

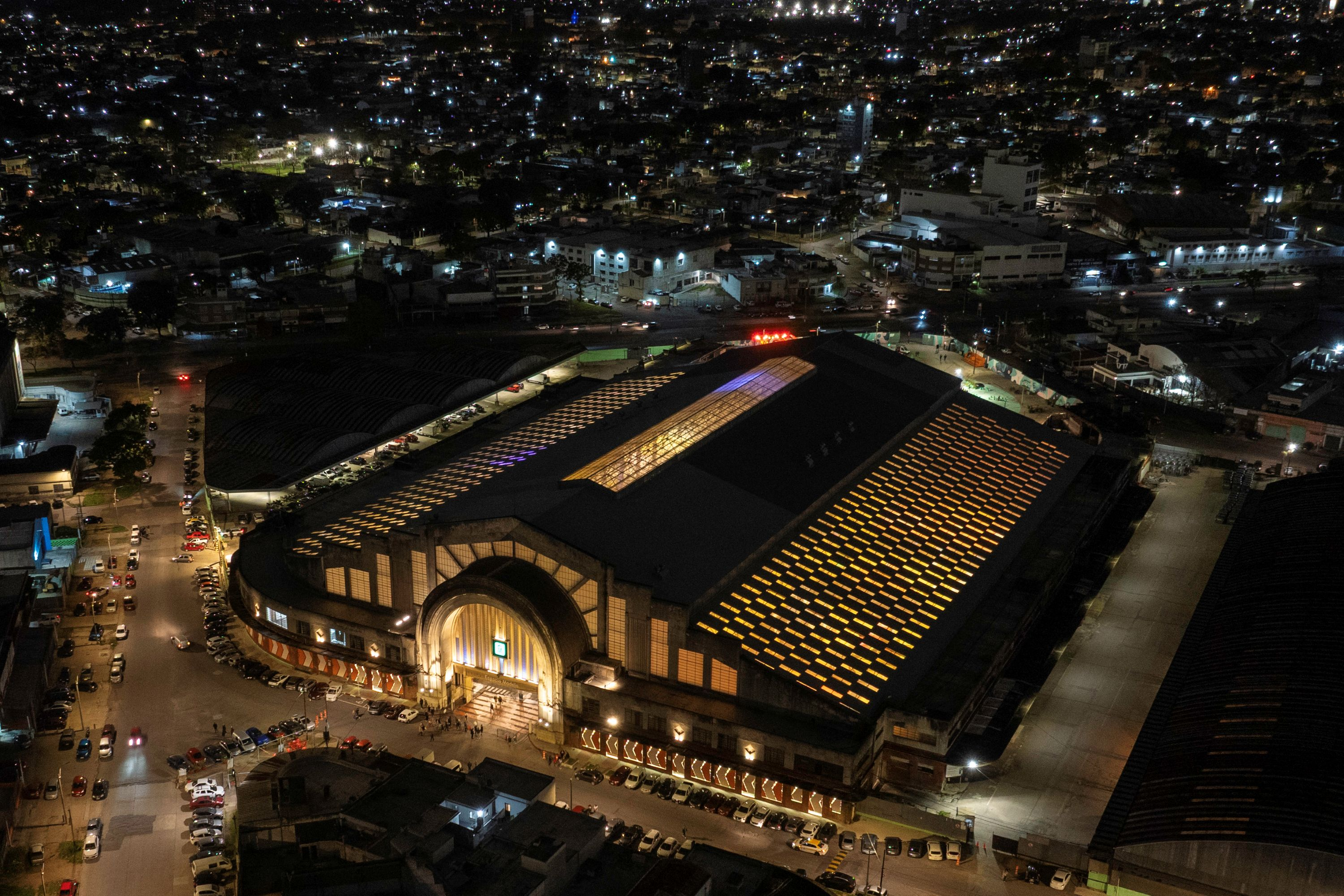
Air view of the historic landmark Mercado Modelo, turned into an entertainment center with the name Espacio Modelo
