= Conciliación =

- Barrio
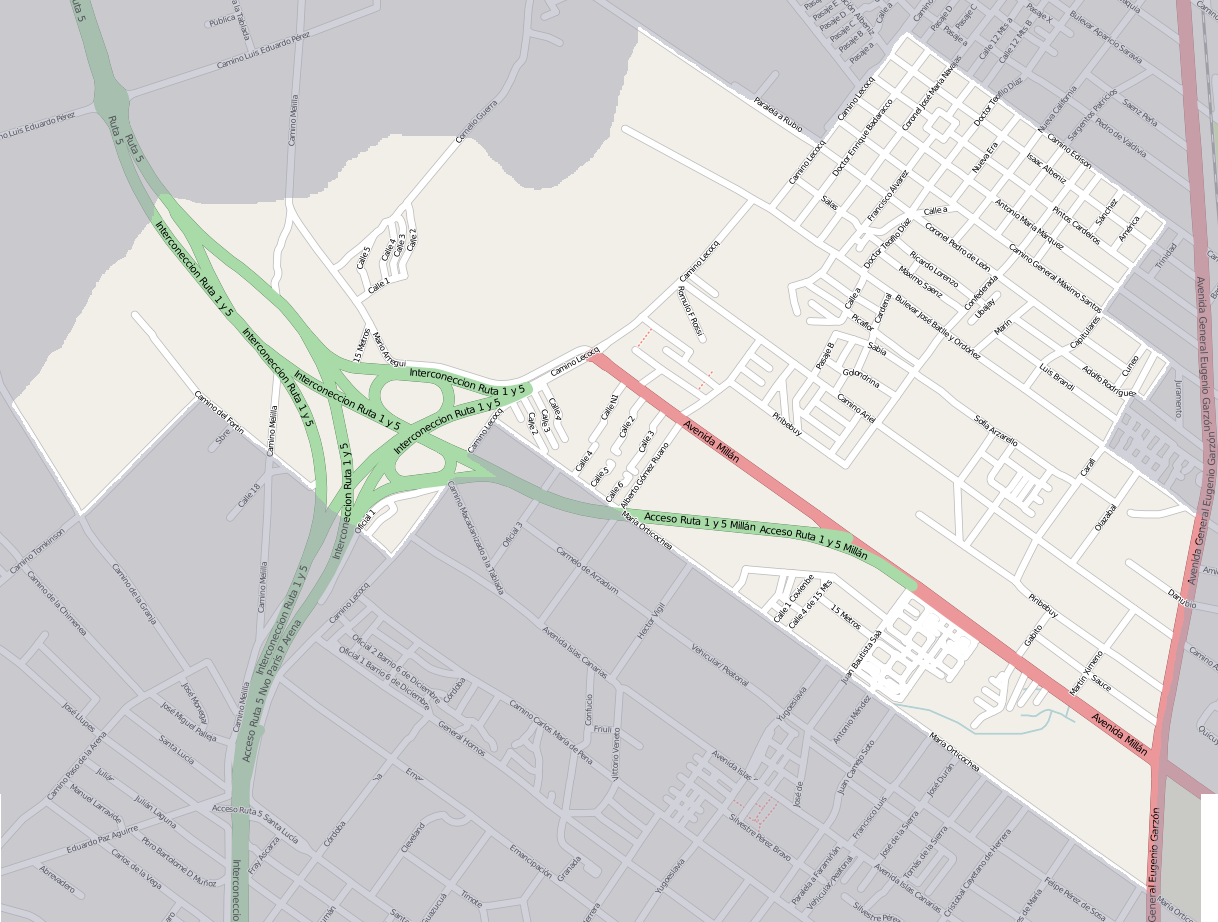
- Street map of Conciliación-Sayago Norte

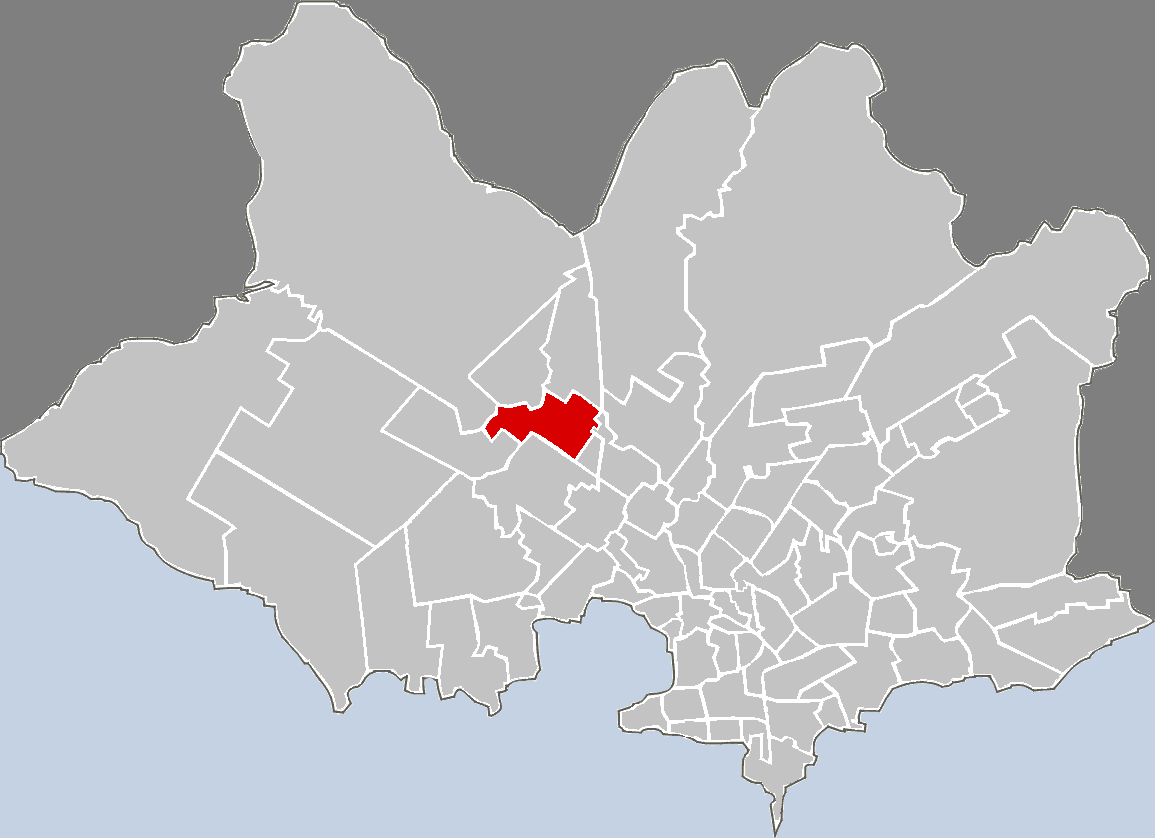
- Location of Conciliación/Sayago Norte in Montevideo
- Coordinates: 34°49′25″S 56°13′55″W
- Country: Uruguay
- Department: Montevideo Department
- City: Montevideo

Conciliación is a barrio (neighbourhood or district) of Montevideo, Uruguay.

== Places of worship ==
- Parish Church of St Vincent Pallotti (Roman Catholic, Pallottines)

== See also ==
- Barrios of Montevideo
