= Piedras Blancas, Montevideo =

Piedras Blancas
- Barrio
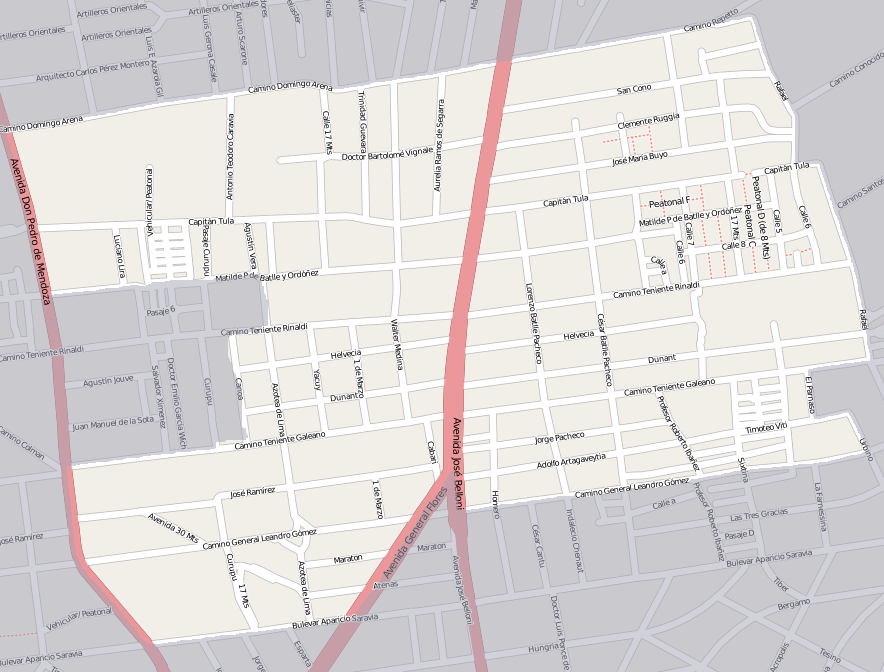
- Street map of Piedras Blancas

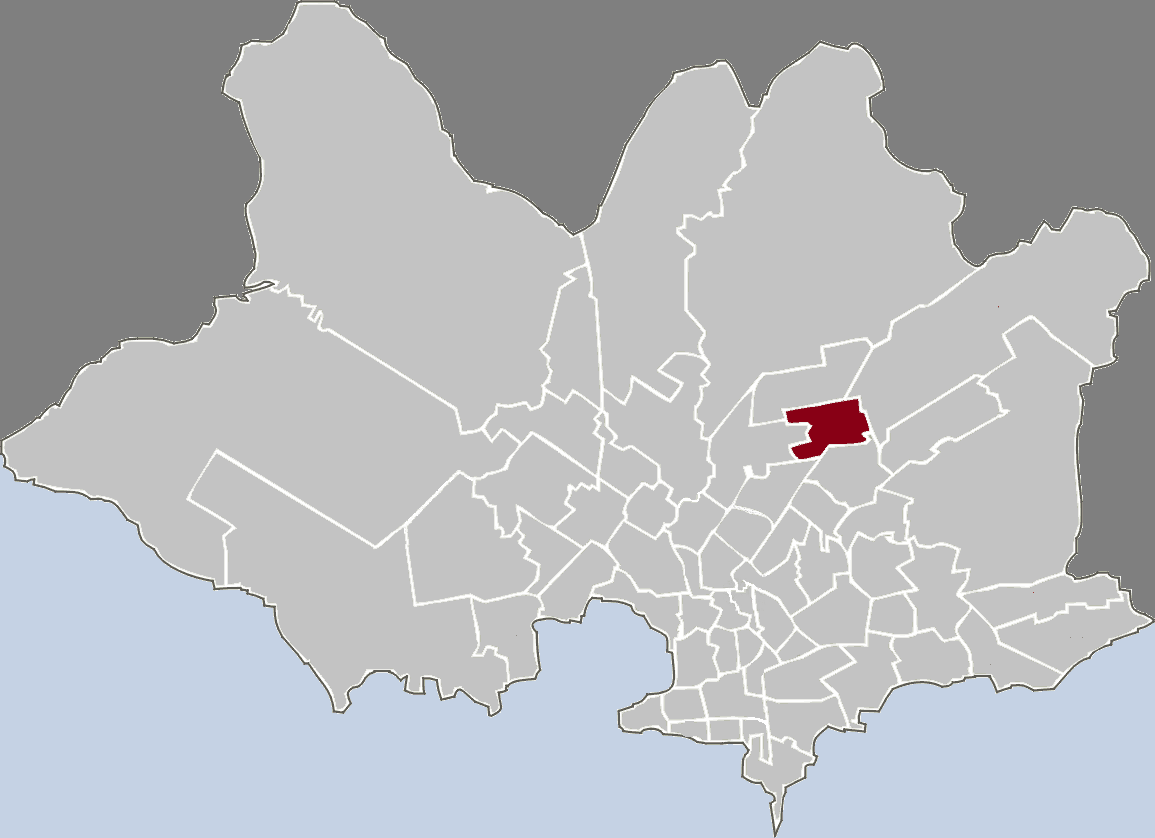
- Location of Piedras Blancas in Montevideo
- Coordinates: 34°49′25″S 56°8′25″W
- Country: Uruguay
- Department: Montevideo Department
- City: Montevideo

Piedras Blancas is a barrio (neighbourhood or district) of Montevideo, Uruguay.

== Places of worship ==
- Parish Church of Our Lady of the Rosary of Pompei (Roman Catholic)

== See also ==
- Barrios of Montevideo
