= Ituzaingó, Montevideo =

Ituzaingó
- Barrio
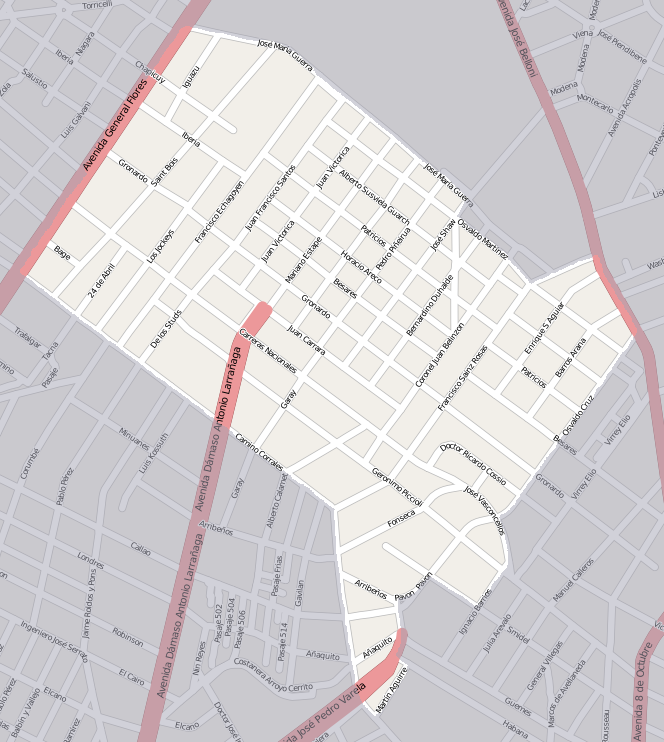
- Street map of Ituzaingó

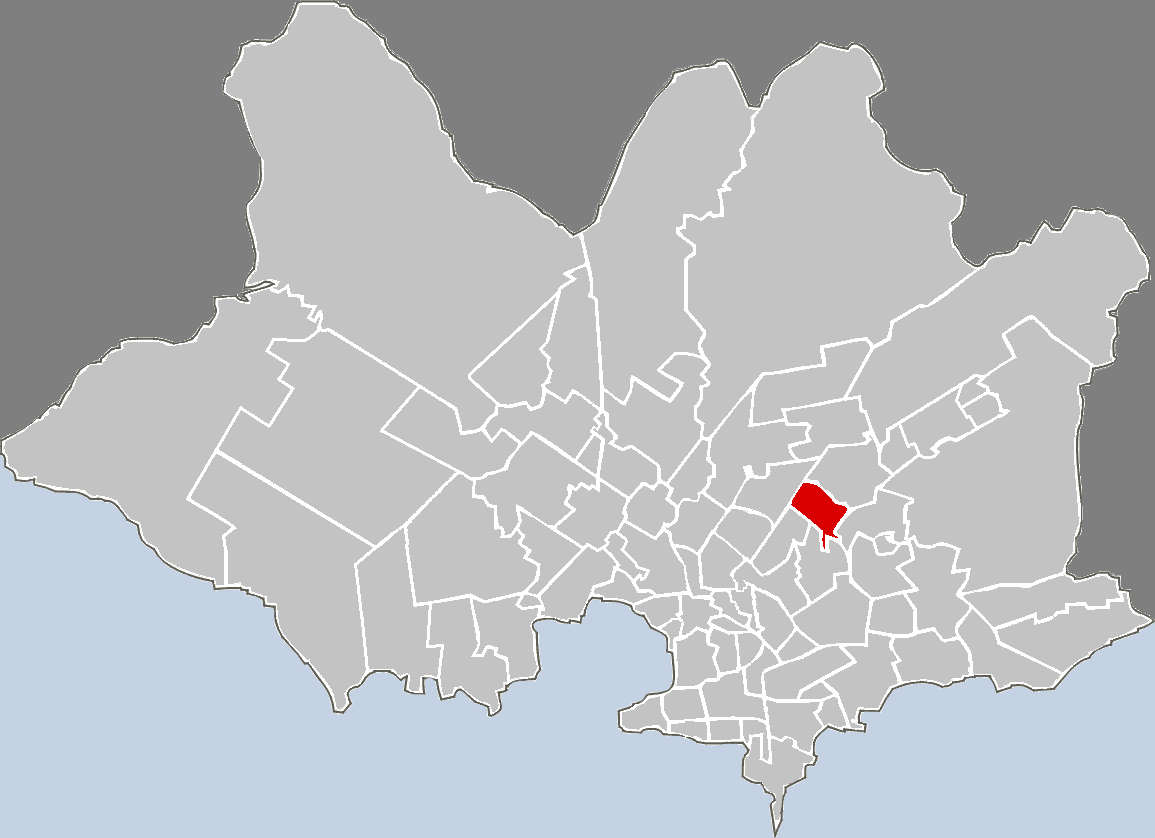
- Location of Ituzaingó in Montevideo
- Coordinates: 34°50′49″S 56°8′39″W
- Country: Uruguay
- Department: Montevideo Department
- City: Montevideo

Ituzaingó is a barrio (neighbourhood or district) of Montevideo, Uruguay.

== Location ==
Limita con Perez Castellanos al Suroeste, con Las Acacias al Oeste, con Jardines del Hipódromo al Norte/Noreste, con Flor de Maroñas al Este y Villa Española al Sur/Sureste.

== Places of worship ==
- Parish Church of Our Lady of the Sacred Heart and St. Rita (Maroñas), which is also a Roman Catholic pilgrimage sanctuary

== See also ==
- Barrios of Montevideo
