= Las Acacias, Montevideo =

Las Acacias
- Barrio
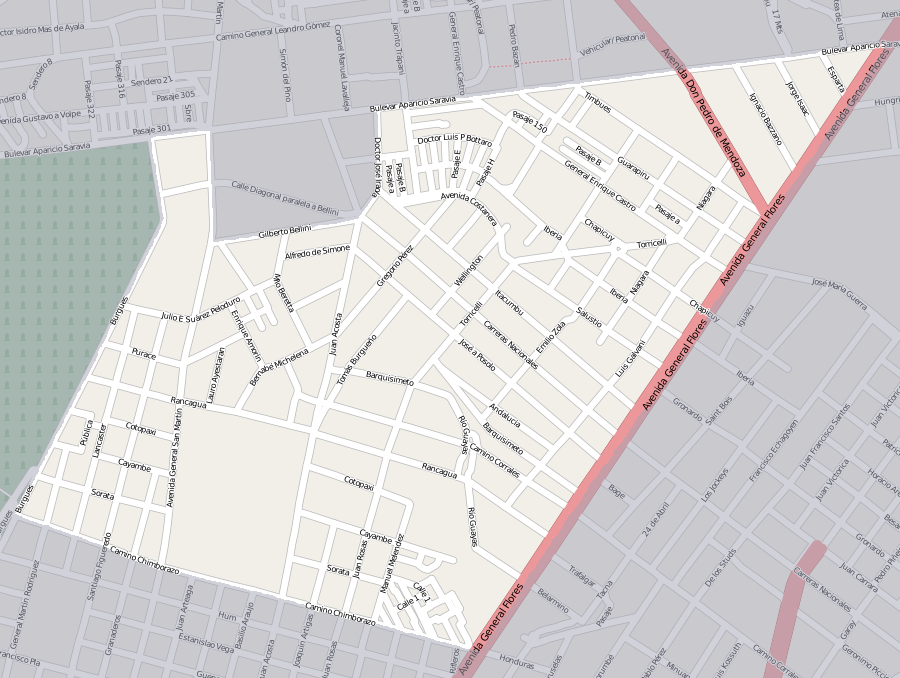
- Street map of Las Acacias

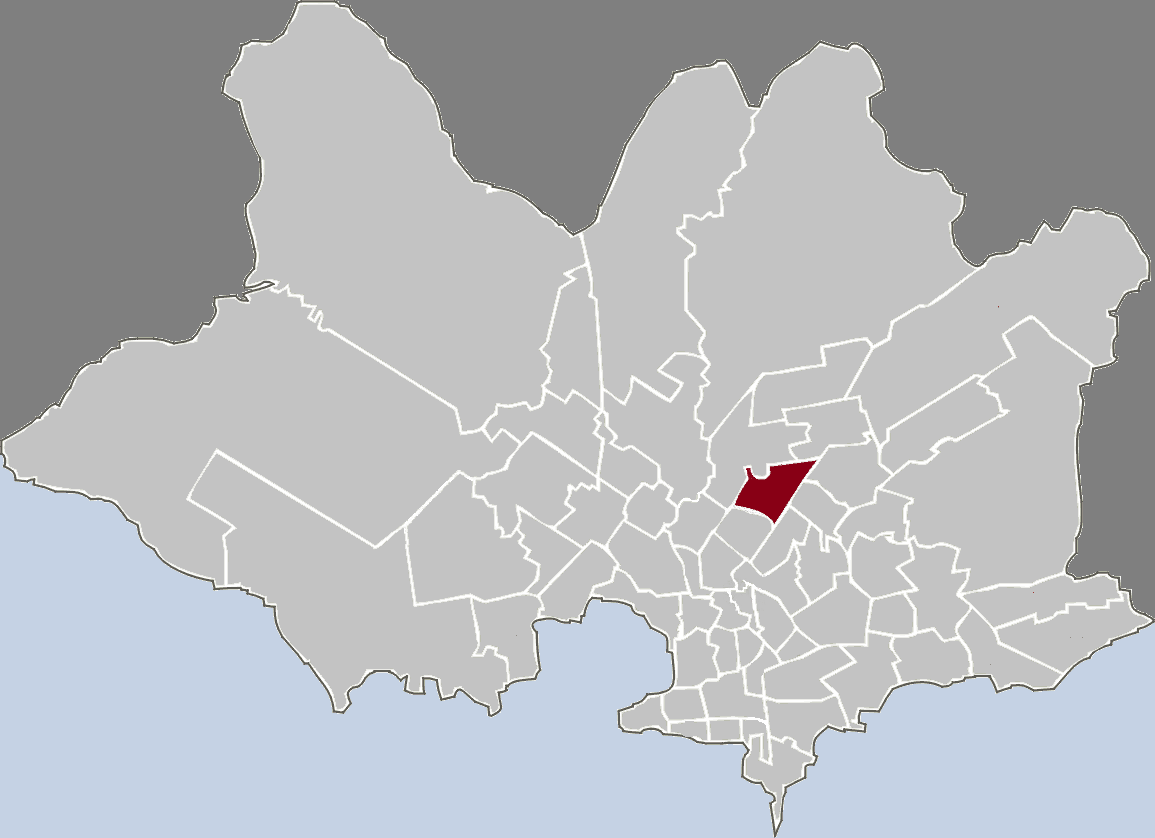
- Location of Las Acacias in Montevideo
- Coordinates: 34°50′36″S 56°9′48″W
- Country: Uruguay
- Department: Montevideo Department
- City: Montevideo

Las Acacias is a barrio (neighbourhood or district) of Montevideo, Uruguay.

== Landmarks ==
This neighborhood is the home of Peñarol's stadium, Estadio Contador Damiani (formerly Las Acacias Stadium). Peñarol Football Club is one of the two major soccer teams in Uruguay.

== Places of worship ==
- Parish Church of the Sacred Hearts, José A. Possolo 4025 (Roman Catholic)

== See also ==
- Barrios of Montevideo
