= Peñarol, Montevideo =

Peñarol–Lavalleja
- Barrio
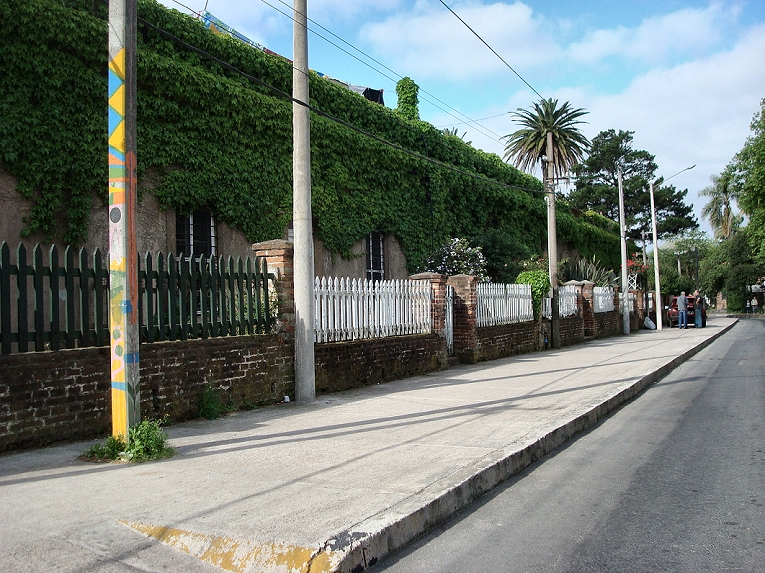
- Historic workers residences of the railroad company

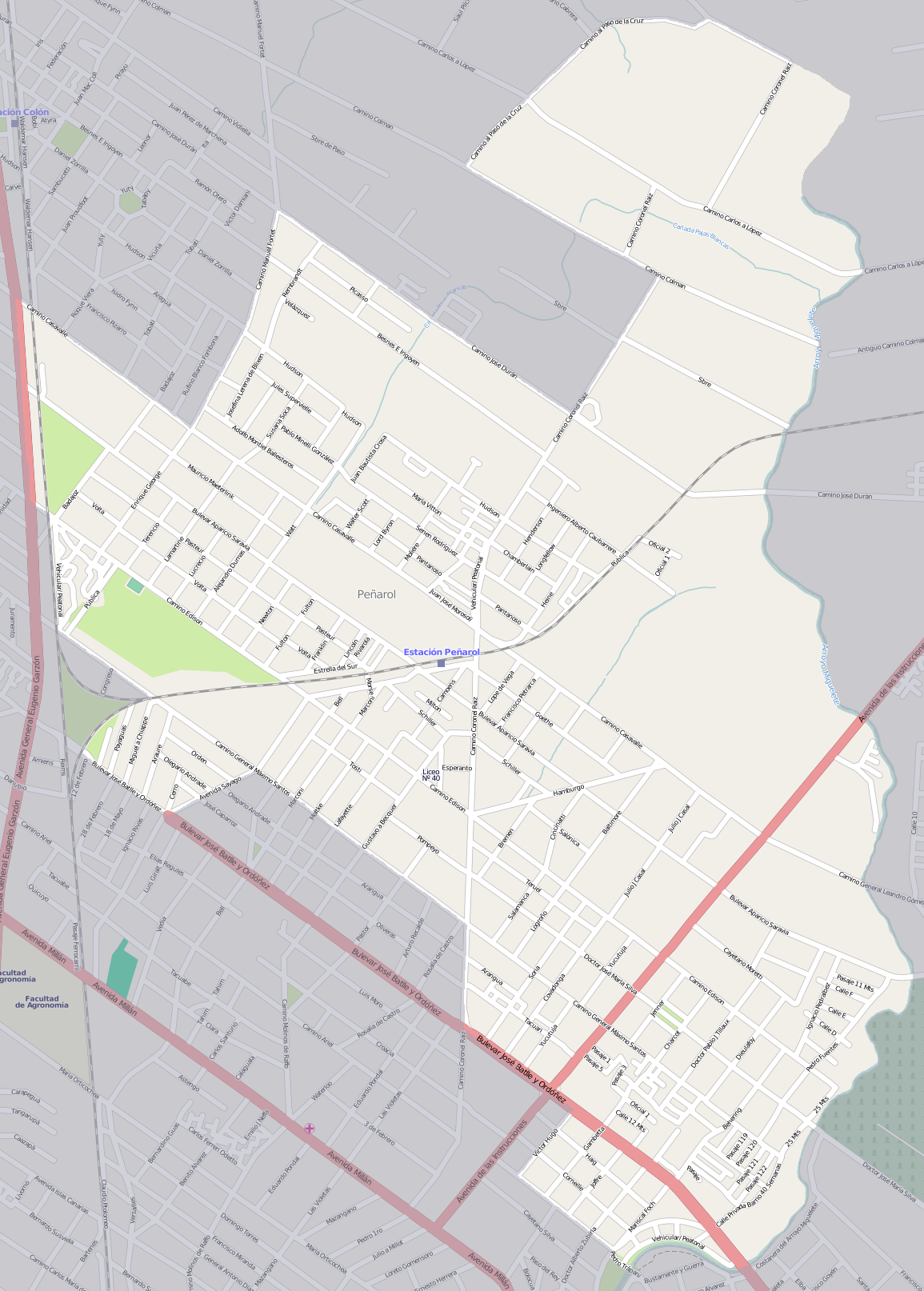
- Street map of Peñarol–Lavalleja

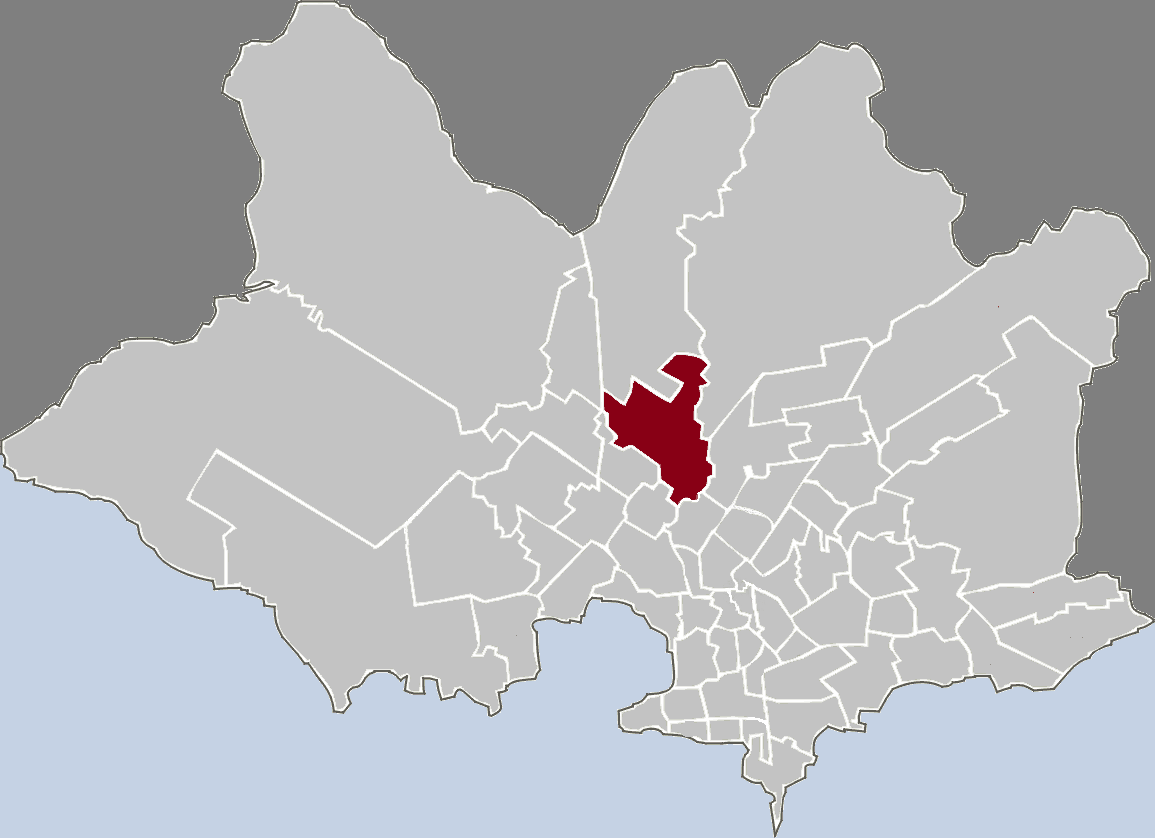
- Location of Peñarol–Lavalleja in Montevideo
- Coordinates: 34°49′S 56°11′W
- Country: Uruguay
- Department: Montevideo Department
- City: Montevideo

Peñarol, also known as Peñarol–Lavalleja, is a working-class barrio (neighbourhood or district) of Montevideo, Uruguay.

On 10 March 1913, Peñarol was declared a "pueblo" (village) by the Act of Ley Nº 4.311. On 1 July 1953, its status was elevated to "villa" (town) by the Act of Ley Nº 11.967. Ever since, it has been integrated to Montevideo.

== Toponymic ==
When Montevideo was a colonial walled city and the area of Peñarol had no name and was all farms field, Giovanni Battista Crosa an oriundo from Pinerolo (Piedmont, Italy), set up a grocery store in 1776, where today is the intersection of Coronel Raíz and Route 102 (perimeter), in the currently piped nascent Miguelete stream. Crosa nicknamed the district with the name of his hometown, Pinerolo, whose name is Pinareul in Piedmontese (or Pignerol in French) and was corrupted in popular speech as Peñarol.

== Places of worship ==
- Parish Church of St. Joseph, Husband of Mary, Av. Instrucciones 1343 (Roman Catholic)

== Sports ==
Club Atlético Peñarol – also known as Carboneros, Aurinegros, and (familiarly) Manyas – is a Uruguayan sports club from Peñarol. Throughout its history the club has also participated in other sports, such as basketball and cycling. Its focus has always been on football, a sport in which the club excels, having never been relegated from the top division.

== See also ==
- Barrios of Montevideo
