= María Auxiliadora =

María Auxiliadora is the Spanish language translation of Mary, Help of Christians. In Portuguese it is spelled Maria, without the diacritic.

It may also refer to:

== Geographic regions ==
- María Auxiliadora, Distrito Nacional a sector in the city of Santo Domingo in the Dominican Republic
- María Auxiliadora, Guanajuato, a town near the municipality of San Felipe, Guanajuato, Mexico

== Churches ==
- María Auxiliadora, Breña, a Roman Catholic Minor Basilica in Breña, Lima, Peru
- María Auxiliadora, Colón, Montevideo, a Roman Catholic parish church in Colón, Montevideo, Uruguay
- María Auxiliadora, Montevideo, a Roman Catholic parish church in Parque Rodó, Montevideo, Uruguay

== People ==
- Maria Auxiliadora (artist), a Brazilian self-taught painter.

== Transport ==
- María Auxiliadora metro station, a rapid transit station in Lima, Peru
