= Tourism in Uruguay =

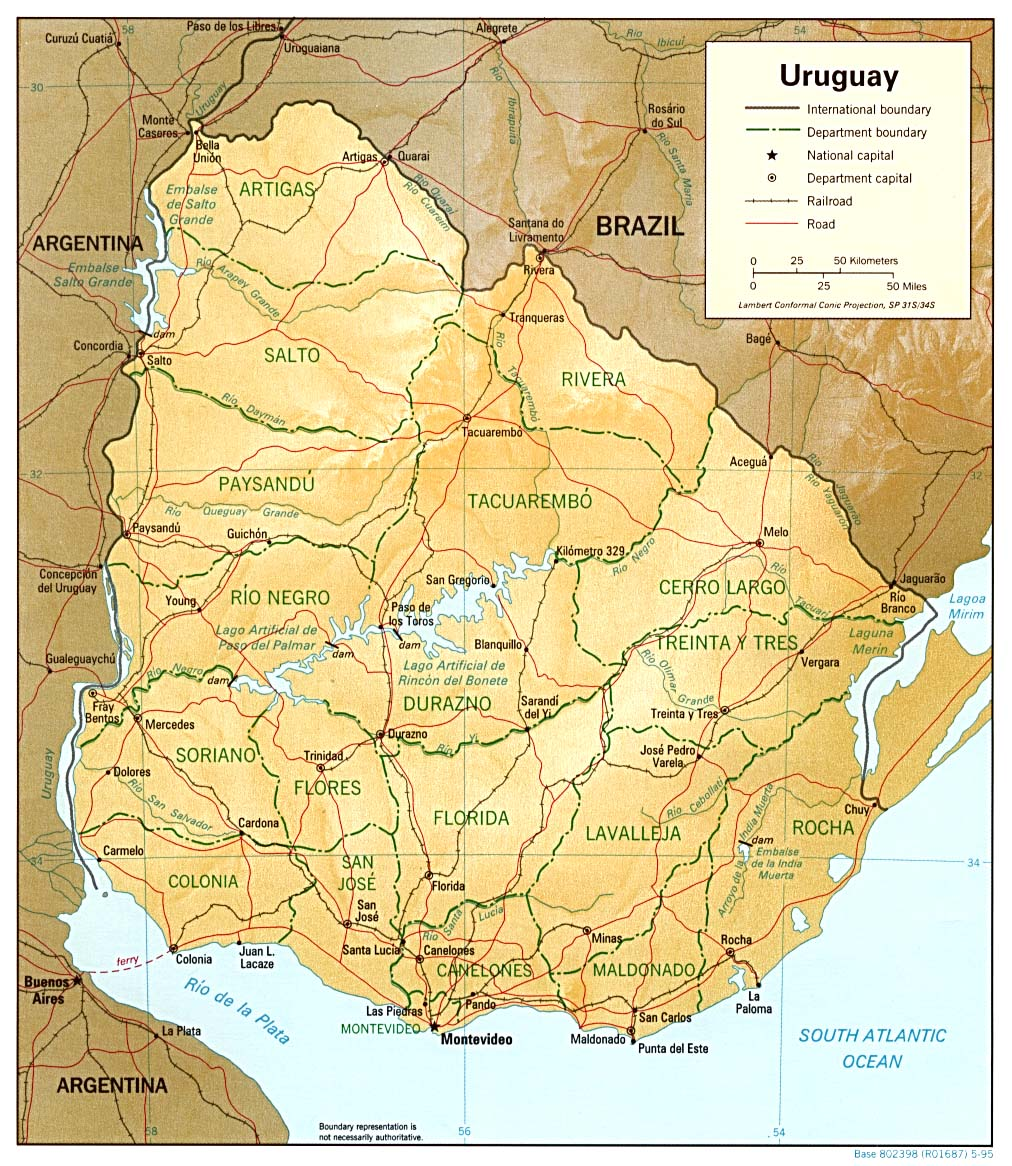
Relief map of Uruguay

Tourism in Uruguay is an important part of the nation's economy. Uruguay's tourist destinations include: Punta del Este, Piriápolis, Montevideo, Colonia del Sacramento, Salto, Lavalleja, Rocha, Artigas, Rivera, and others.

In 2023, 3.8 million tourists entered Uruguay, of which the majority were Argentines and Brazilians, followed by Chileans, Paraguayans, Americans and Europeans of various nationalities.

== Statistics ==
Tourist arrivals of 2019 in %

In 2025 about 3.6 million tourists visited the country.

In 2023, 3.8 million tourists entered Uruguay, of which the majority were Argentines. This is an increase which showed that in 2007, 1.8 million tourists visited and spent around US$800 million. Domestic tourist expenditures account for around 60% of the nation's tourist activity.

Uruguay is the Latin American country that receives the most tourists in relation to its population. For Uruguay, Argentine tourism represents 56% of international inbound tourism, and 70% during the summer months. Although Argentine holidaymakers are an important target market for tourism in Uruguay, before 2020 the country managed to position itself as an important tourist destination to other markets, receiving a high flow of visitors from countries such as Brazil (490,000 in 2025), Paraguay, Chileans, Americans and Europeans of various nationalities.

== Regions ==
=== Punta del Este ===
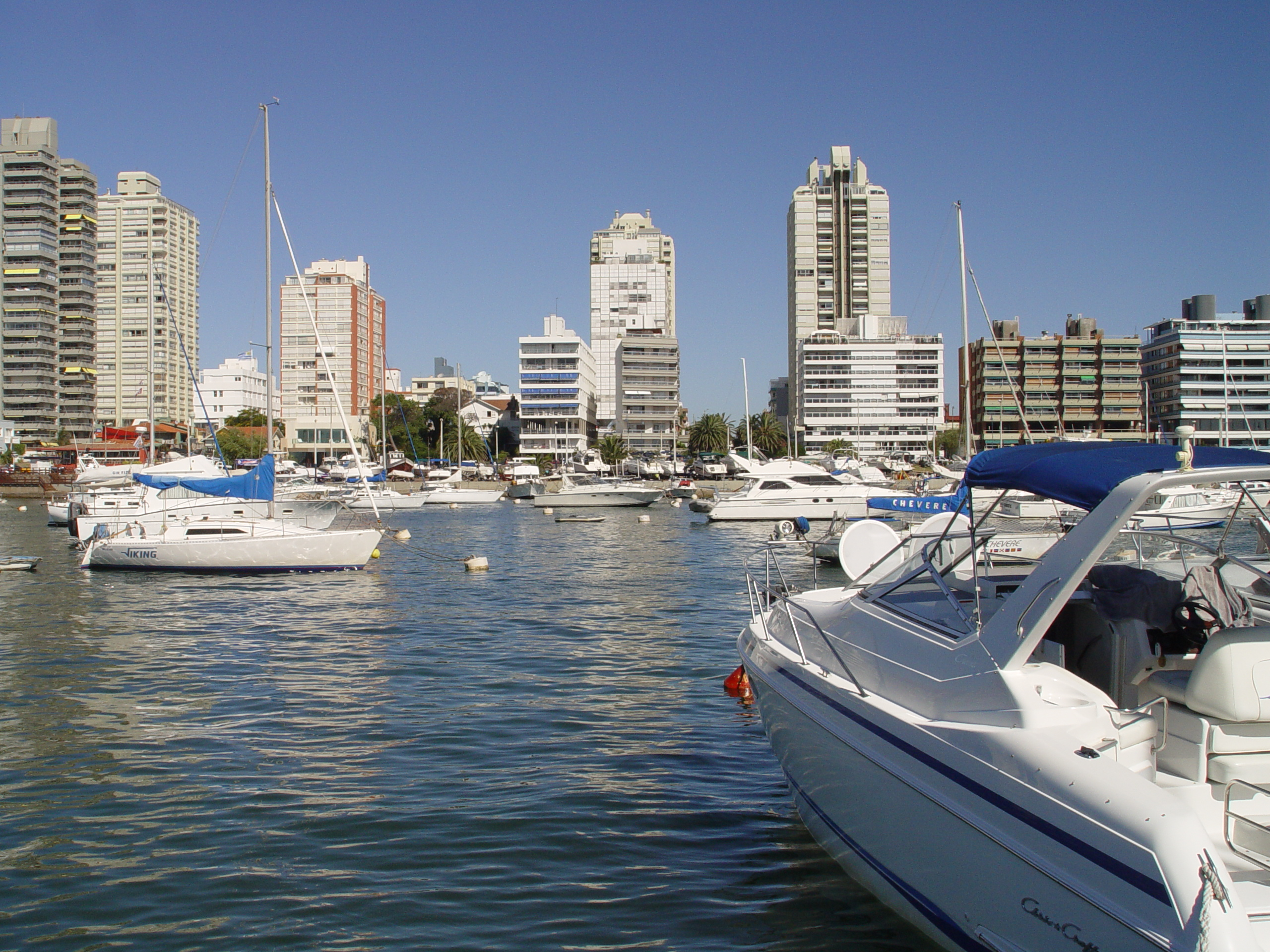
Punta del Este, the queen of the Uruguayan riviera

Punta del Este is located at the extreme southeast of the country, on a small peninsula that gives it its name and taken as conventional limit on the Uruguayan coast between Atlantic Ocean and River Plate. Its beaches are divided into Mansa, or meek, (river side) and Brava, or brave, (ocean side). The name given to these beaches is because the first, to give to the River Plate and be sheltered from the winds and currents from the Atlantic Ocean, almost always presents its fairly calm waters, while the "Brava" beach, the longer ocean has a much more impetuous waves. Punta del Este is virtually connected to the city of Maldonado and eastward spread widely, encompassing La Barra and José Ignacio. It has 122 hotels, 80 restaurants, an international airport and a yacht port that can accommodate 500 boats. About 8 kilometers southeast of Punta del Este is the Lobos Island full of South American fur seals.

=== Piriápolis ===
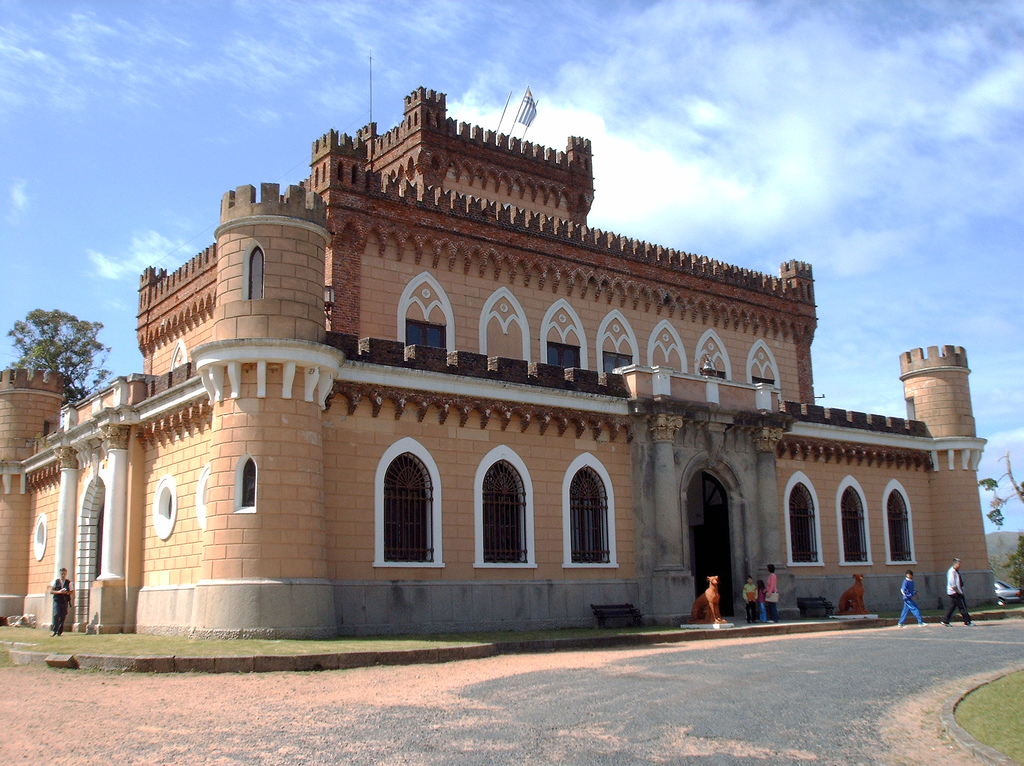
Piria Castle

Piriápolis is a city and resort of Maldonado Department, located an hour's drive east of the capital, Montevideo. It has a fixed population of 7,579 inhabitants, although the floating population is much higher, especially between December and March. It was the first resort town in the country, today under the shadow of Punta del Este, the largest and most popular. It welcomes many Argentine visitors and a growing number of Europeans, although domestic tourism is very important.

The city has its axis around the Rambla de los Argentinos, a coastal avenue that takes its name from the major customers of the founder of the city, the hotel Francisco Piria. With an economy centred on tourism, the city has hotels and casinos, a very active nightlife in the summer months as well as public parks, religious centers, viewpoints, etc. In high season, one can reach Piriápolis by ferry from the port of Montevideo and Buenos Aires.

The Chapel of San Antonio, on top of the homonymous hill, one of many around the city, offers a panoramic view and can be reached by road or by air chair. For more intrepid travellers it offers the possibility to climb the third highest mountain in the country, the Pan de Azúcar, near its namesake city, about 10 km outside the resort.

Near Piriápolis are rock formations by the sea, called Punta Fría, Punta Colorada and Punta Negra, which have excellent fishing all year round. There are also white sand beaches such as San Francisco and Playa Hermosa , which are a very short distance from the resort centre.

=== La Paloma ===
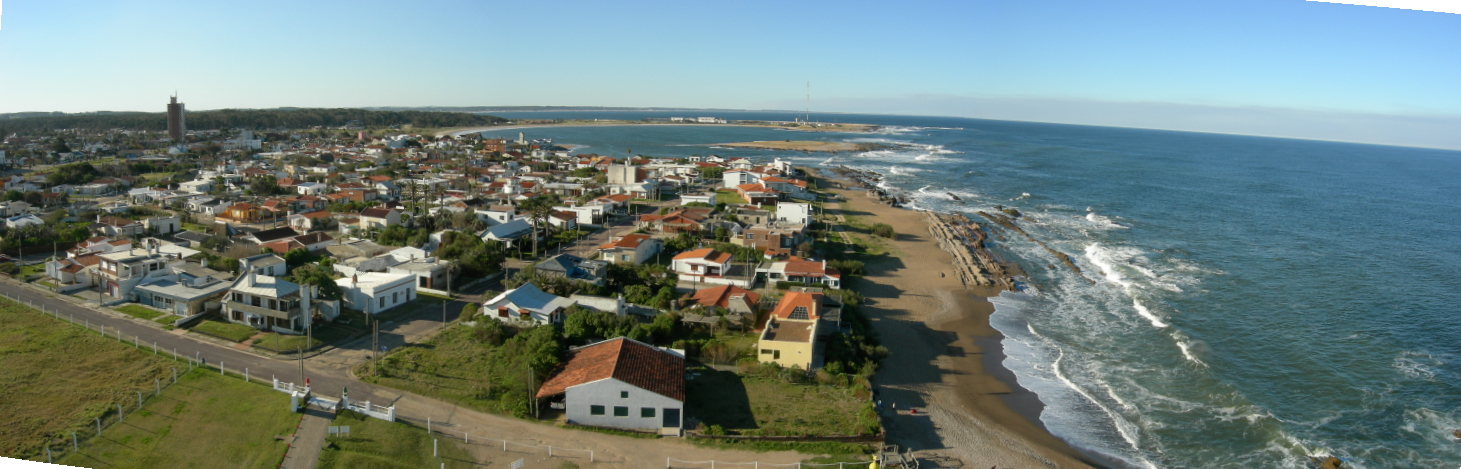
La Paloma

La Paloma is an ocean resort located at the Cape of Santa María, founded on September 1, 1874. It is located in the east in the Rocha Department. It is 240 km from Montevideo and is approximately 90 km from Punta del Este and 160 km from Chuy, a town bordering Brazil. It is known for its tranquility and its beautiful beaches, whose length is approximately 20 km. It has a permanent population of 5,300 inhabitants, but with tourist arrivals it swells to 30,000 in the summer months (January–February–March). The resort owes its name to that formerly the Cape Santa María was a very feared by sailors tip, and from afar because of the amount of rocks and the foam of the waves, it seems to make the outline of a dove.

The homes are alpine style of French design. Most are for rent. La Paloma has different beaches with different characteristics (with rocks, with waves, calm waters, deep, fishing). Some of them are La Aguada, Costa Azul, La Balconada, Anaconda y El Cabito.

In the department of Rocha, it is also a paradise for fans of Birdwatching

=== Punta del Diablo ===
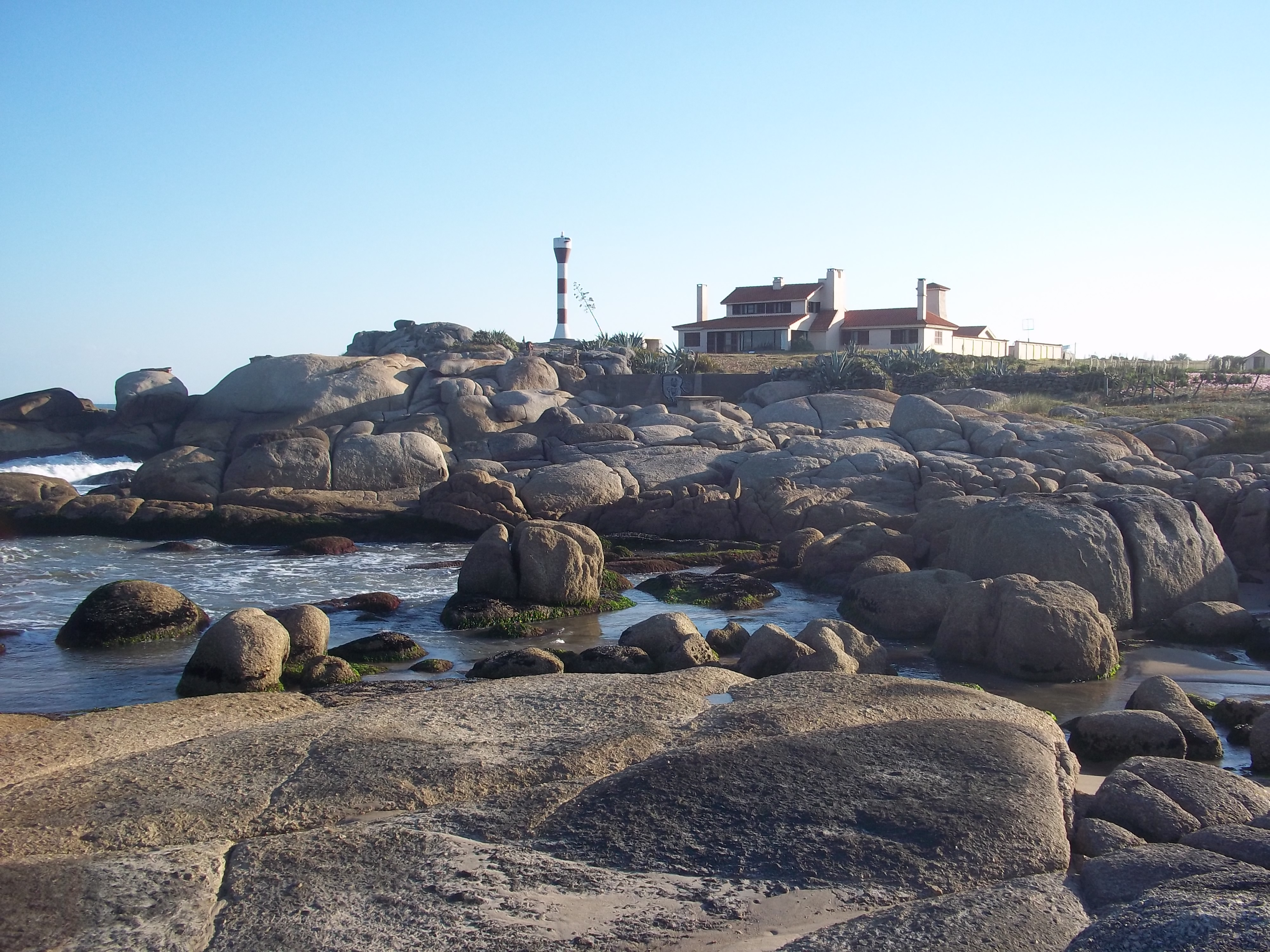
Coast of Punta del Diablo

The Resort Punta del Diablo was originally a small fishing village. It is located on the coast of Rocha Department. It is 298 km from Montevideo.

Its beaches, framed on three rocky headlands that make up the "trident", occupy about 10 km of coastline.

Its permanent population is about 650 inhabitants, mostly fishermen and craftsmen. In summer it becomes one of the main Uruguayan resorts welcoming a large influx of Argentine, Brazilian and European tourists.

=== La Pedrera ===
La Pedrera is located at km 227.200 of Route 10, Juan Díaz de Solís, a little east of Cape of Santa María, on a narrow and small peninsula called Punta Rubia.

It is a small resort with an excellent infrastructure for accommodation. It has a strong exclusive and cosmopolitan character and is ideal for family holidays. Its beaches are excellent for both rest and recreation, hosting such activities as fishing and many other water sports.

=== Barra del Chuy ===
The resort Barra del Chuy is 14 km from the city of Chuy.

=== La Coronilla ===
La Coronilla is a place where peace of mind is lived. Through its extensive beaches of fine sand it can feel the peace of nature.

Fans to watch of marine wildlife and sport fishing, found at this site many possible embodiments. Is possible to see whales, dolphins and sea turtles from the observatories of Cerro Verde, and it can also enjoy one of nature's finest fishing in the world.

=== Santa Teresa ===
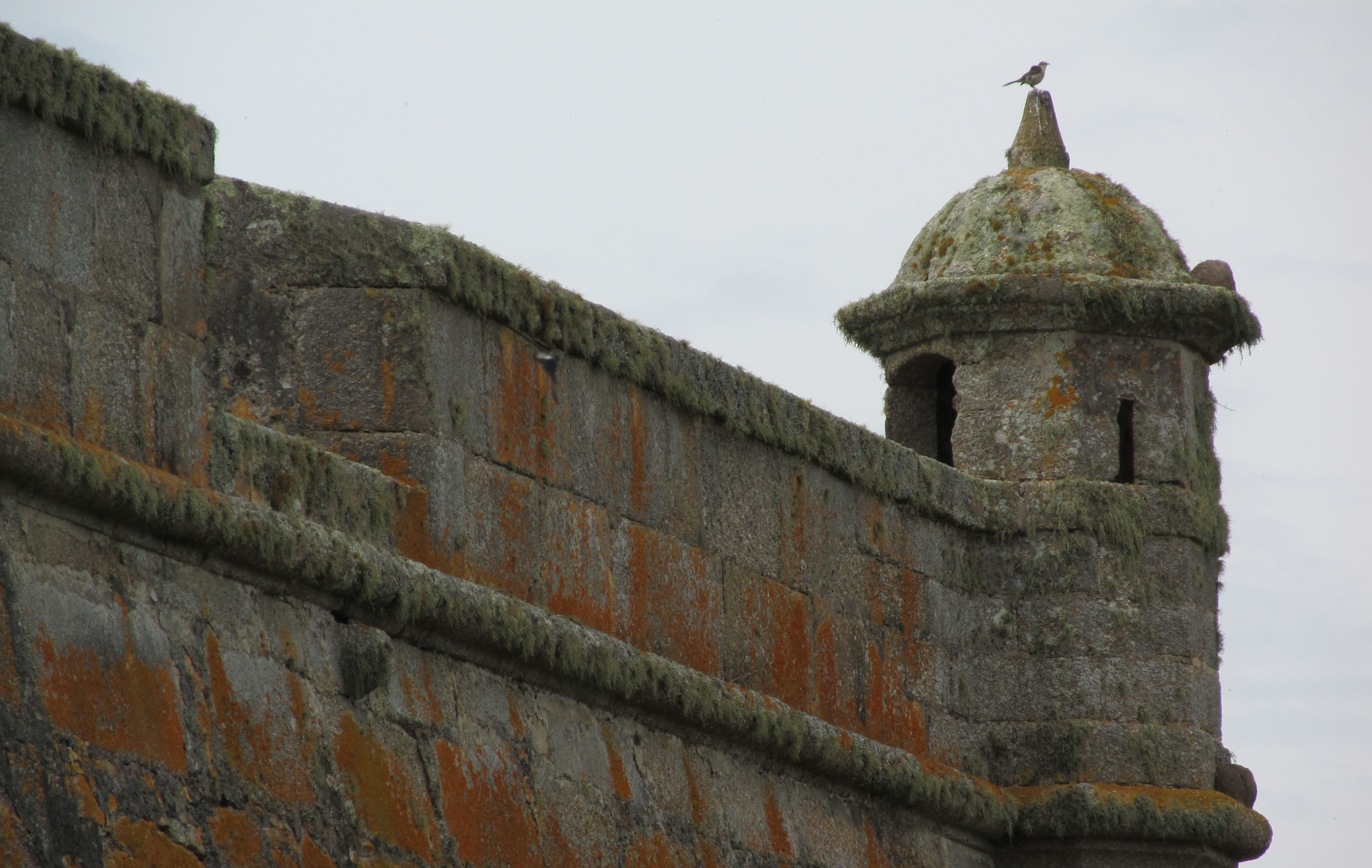
Santa Teresa fortress

This is a National Park where, outside the summer months, one can go surfing with virtually no crowd. It is a beach frequented by Brazilian tourists.

=== Aguas Dulces ===
Aguas Dulces is located at km 277,500 of Route 10, Juan Díaz de Solís.

=== Cabo Polonio ===
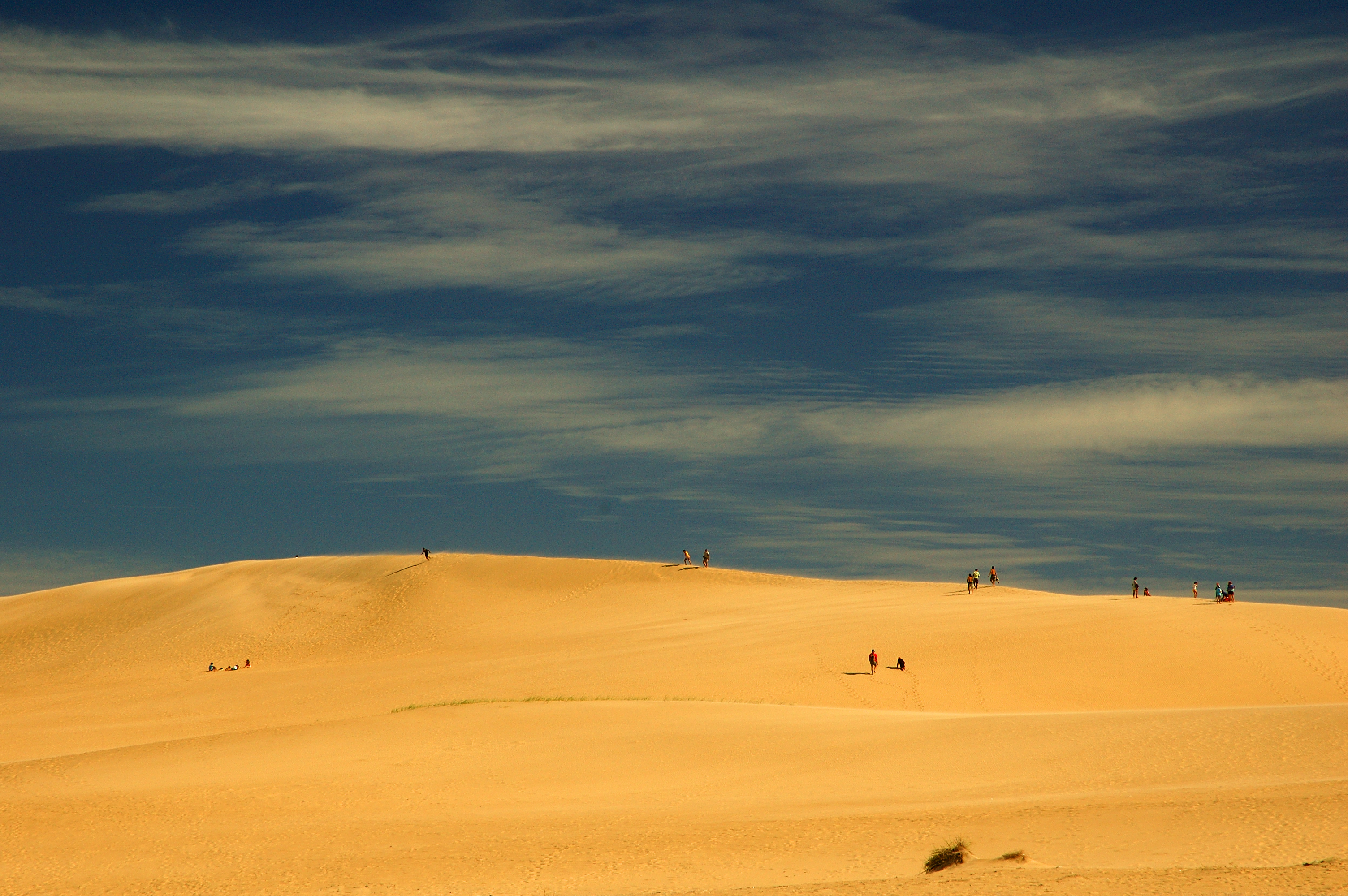
Sand dunes near Cabo Polonio

Cabo Polonio is a lovely, lonely fishing village. It owes its attraction to the magical environment thanks to its hardiness is generated and the primitive state that is its nature. The time seems stopped in this place sheltered from the civilization that preserves the peace of a lost place. No electricity, no running water, no gas, Cabo Polonio attracts each day more tourists who do not feel the lack of these services because they value the ability to disconnect from the world.

What began as a small fishing village, it was getting more and more number of people that created a large increase in tourism activities. This peculiar place in the world, has a small stable population and a large floating population, but its tranquility is interrupted only by the low flight of the wombs or the howl of sea lions.

=== Montevideo ===
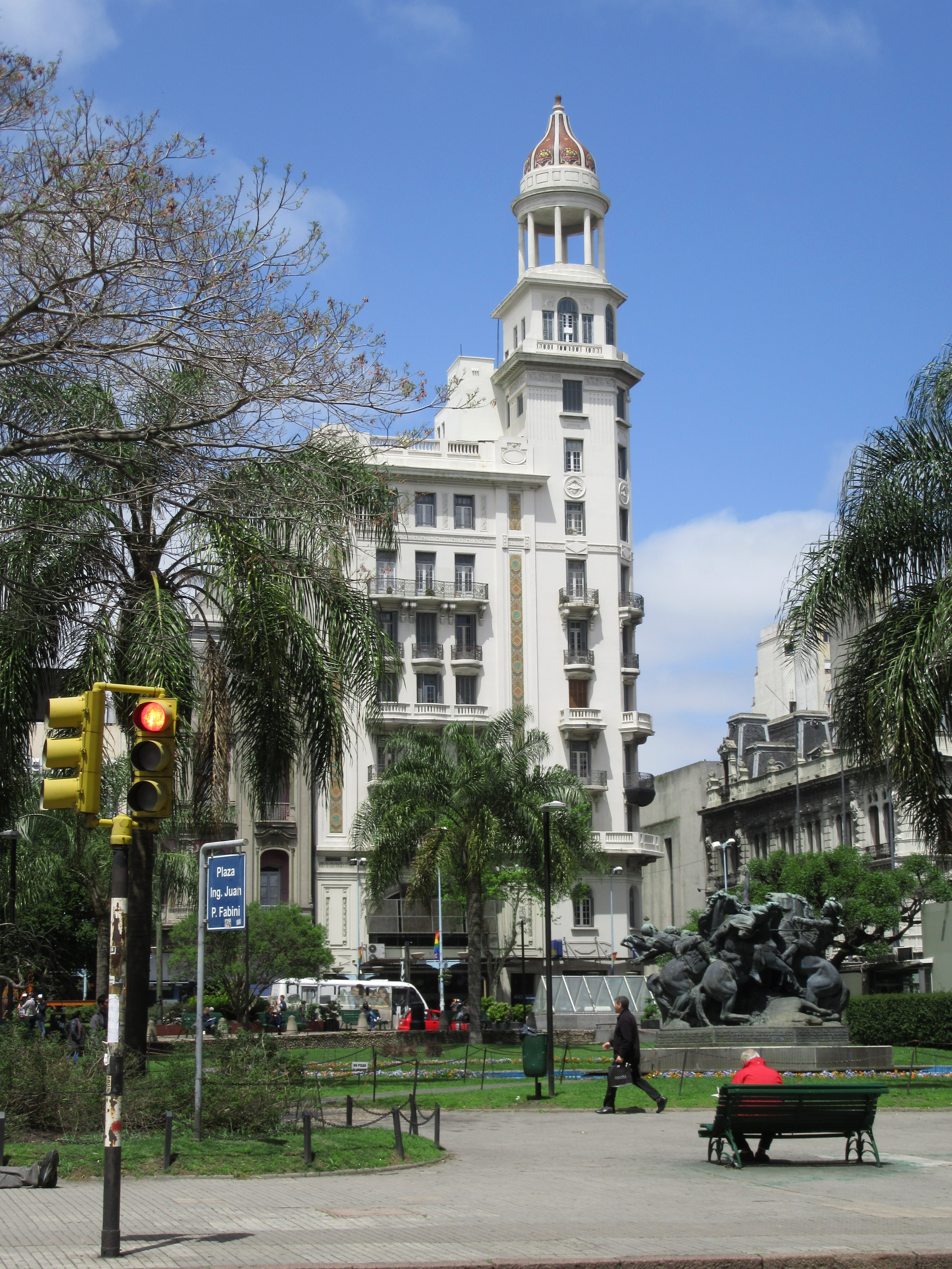
Plaza Fabini in Montevideo

Montevideo is the southernmost capital city in the Americas. As broad green walks, both within the city and in the periphery, are featured the Parque Rodó neighborhood, characterized by the large namesake park of 25 hectares; Parque Batlle, with several kilometers long situated where is the Estadio Centenario, stadium hosted the first World Cup in history, two more football stadiums and the velodrome of the city, and the running track; the neighborhood of Prado also offers ample green spaces and places worth visiting; the Cerro neighborhood, looking at the coast is the Parque Dr. Carlos Vaz Ferreira along with the Cerro golf club; in the Santiago Vazquez in western border with the department of San José, is the Parque Lecocq and south of the same the Parque Artigas.

Plaza Independencia is also a short walk from the Montevideo Esplanade. The Esplanade (Rambla) is one of the city's numerous waterfront districts, which also include Ramírez Beach (home to the Mercosur Common Market headquarters), Pocitos, and a row of similar communities. A new terminal at Carrasco International Airport was completed in 2009, contributing to Montevideo's standing as the major city with the highest quality of life in Latin America.

For fans of equestrian sports is the Maroñas National Racecourse, where numerous races are run, being the most traditional the Premio Ramírez, which takes place every January 6.

Montevideo has Torres García Museum, José Gurvich Museum, the National Museum of Visual Arts and the Juan Manuel Blanes Museum. The grounds of the Blanes Museum host the Japanese Garden of Montevideo with a koi pond.

The "shoppings" or malls is an attraction for Montevideans and tourists: Tristán Narvaja (Sunday), in the central district of Cordón; Villa Biarritz and La Teja (Saturday and Tuesday), Parque Rodó (Sunday) Piedras Blancas and Belvedere (also on Sundays).

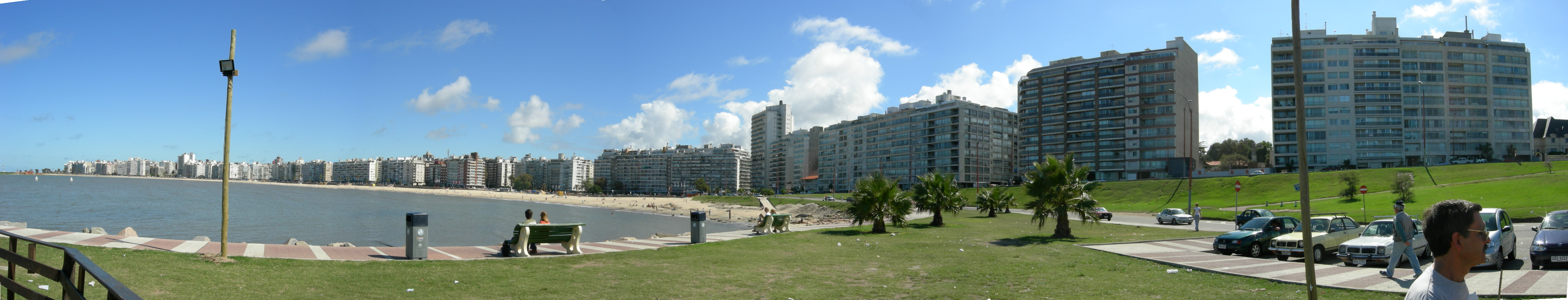
Barrio Pocitos, Montevideo

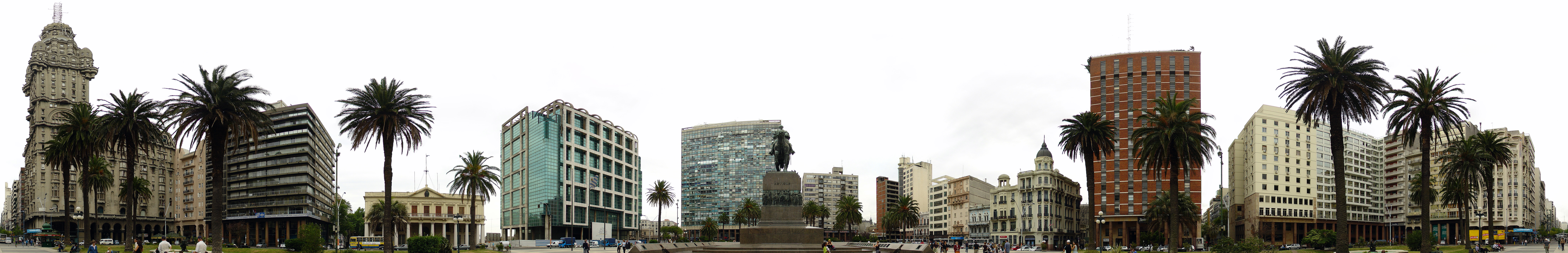
Plaza Independencia

=== Colonia del Sacramento ===
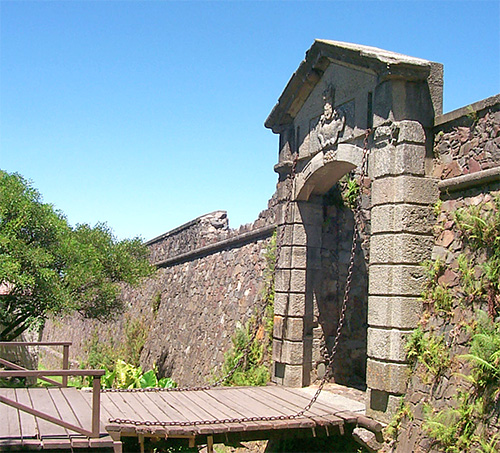
Wall of Colonia del Sacramento

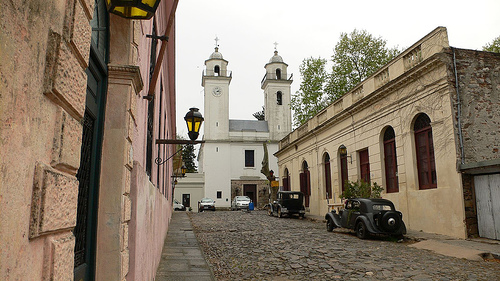
Little changed from its days as a Portuguese-Spanish outpost, Colonia is now a World Heritage Site.

Colonia del Sacramento, that locals call Colonia, is the capital of Colonia. Located a few kilometers southeast of the confluence of the Uruguay River and River Plate, its historic district has been declared a World Heritage in 1995, to illustrate the successful fusion of the Portuguese, Spanish and post-colonial styles. Because of its proximity with the city of Buenos Aires has strong bond with her. There are many travelers who come and go to that destination, as well as the inhabitants of Buenos Aires who have property there. There was a project to join both cities through a binational bridge. The unique preservation of the environment has allowed the use of its streets and exterior of several period films such as De eso no se habla (1993) of María Luisa Bemberg with Marcello Mastroianni as protagonist.

The Real de San Carlos is the area on the outskirts of Colonia where the Spanish troops laid siege to the Portuguese stronghold in 1761. Its name is a tribute to the king Charles III of Spain. It has a small chapel dedicated to Benedict, the first black saint of the Catholic Church. It is now a residential area with many weekend houses, where it can enjoy quiet beaches on the River Plate of fine sand. In the Real de San Carlos was developed at the beginning of 20th century a tourist complex, by initiative of Argentine businessman Nicolás Mihanovich, today in lamentable neglect, which had a hotel-casino (which only has built an "Annex"), bullring, fronton of basque pelota (the largest in South America) and an own power plant.

Other tourist and historical place in Colonia is the Calera de las Huérfanas, located just before the entrance to the city of Carmelo, remnants of the Jesuit Estancia de Belén.

=== Salto ===
Salto is 500 km Montevideo; it has several hot springs resorts. The most important is of Daymán 7 km from the city of Salto, which has a public resort and several private options. 10 km of this city is the Hotel Horacio Quiroga (5 Stars) also features a thermal water park. Going along Route 5 and 70 km is the complex Arapey which has a public sector and a private sector with a Hotel (5 stars). In the departamental capital there buildings of the famous Ing Eladio Dieste.

=== Hot springs of Arapey ===
The Termas del Arapey are located in Salto. They are the oldest, and have the most important and professional tourist infrastructure of Uruguay.

=== Hot springs of Daymán ===
Termas del Dayman are in Salto, whose waters have characteristic that can be used for therapeutic purposes, due to the combination of heat and salinity. They also have the Hydrothermal Daymán Complex, institution of high scientific and ethical standards recognized internationally.

=== Paysandú ===
In the Uruguayan coast, along the Uruguay River, Paysandú is rooted land in traditions and architectural heritage of the country, festivals and sporting events, generous in delicacies where it mix the river fishing with citrus aromas and perfumes of blueberry plantations. Also in this land it emanate thermal waters that turn into fun and quality of life, and it can live fully in its Thermal Centers, served by staff who receives and serves to tourists with warmth and human quality.

=== Artigas ===
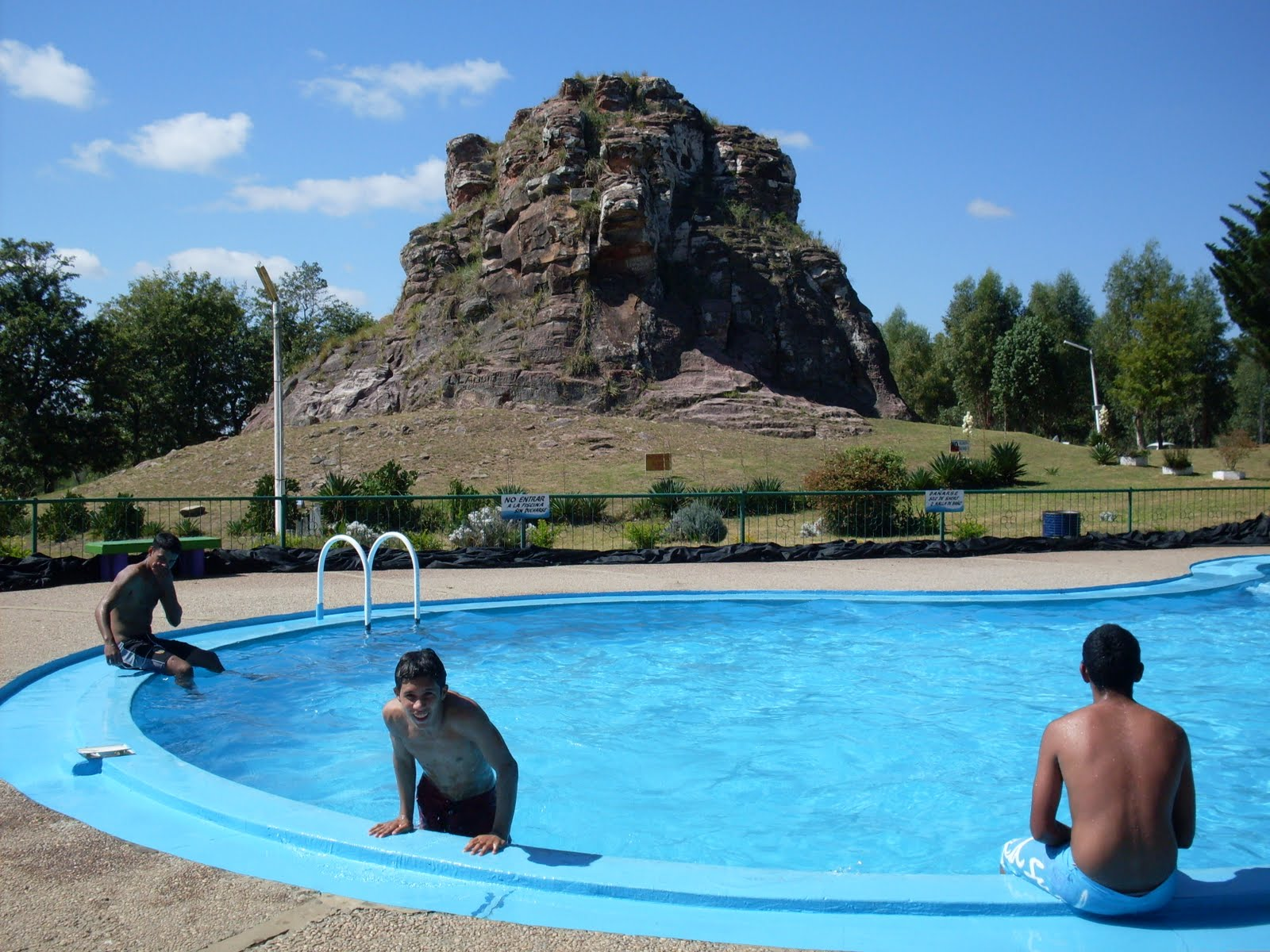
Piedra Pintada

The Artigas Department has several touristic attractions which include: the Piedra Pintada (Painted Rock) with swimming pools, camping and fauna reserve 18 km from the capital, the park on the Cuareim river called Paseo 7 de Setiembre where is the Estadio Matías González, also with camping area and barbecue; while in the vicinity of Bella Unión are found: La Barra, the Parque General Rivera, and Los Pinos resort on the Uruguay River.

Special mention have the Carnival of Artigas, which stands out from other carnivals of Uruguay, due to the link with the Brazilian Samba, infecting its rhythm, color and fun. Between 20 and 30 thousand people attend witness each year, being the pillar in tourist attraction of the department.

Another point of future tourist attraction are its hot springs, which to date have not been exploited commercially, but have great potential due to the triple frontier: Uruguay-Brasil-Argentina.

=== Lavalleja ===
Lavalleja is one of the departments of the country with most scenic variations, but is recognized as the center of mountain tourism in Uruguay. The landscape stretches along the la Cuchilla Grande and its branches which are surrounded by rivers, streams, creeks and waterfalls.

A great tourist attraction of the department is Villa Serrana, known as "La Villa" and the product of an urban planning of architect. Julio Vilamajó. There it can visit the Mesón de las Cañas, the Ventorrillo de la Buena Vista, the Dam Stewart Vargas and adding the wide range of holiday cottages.

It also find unmissable places of Lavalleja like the Salus Park with its source of cougar, big Penitente Waterfall, the luxurious Holiday Park UTE y ANTEL, Camping Arequita with its wide range of amenities, Lake and Hill de los Cuervos, Camping and Dam Aguas Blancas, beautiful Buddhist temples, Gold Mine, the amazing Arequita Hill with its large caves, Verdún Hill and Sanctuary, tourist estancias (La Calaguala, La Fortaleza, Águila Blanca, La Salamora, etc.), the former Castle Batlle, the mysterious Hilo de la Vida, Complex Entre Sierras; and many other attractive places.

Undoubtedly, its capital Minas is a thread very important for Lavallejino tourism. Within the Urban Grid of the city found the luxurious Theatre Lavalleja are its great hall and its museum of the cartoon (unique in South America), the Parque Rodo (Minas) with its large variety of amenities, the Park and Dam of OSE with big green land, the Zorrilla Park, the Fabini Park, the Rambla Estér Moré, the beautiful and historic Plaza Libertad, the House of Culture where is maintained the birthplace of Juan Antonio Lavalleja and also has with many museums, the Park and Hill Artigas with the world's largest equestrian statue in honor of Jose Gervasio Artigas, the Cathedral of the Immaculate Conception of the Minas; and other attractions.

=== Durazno ===
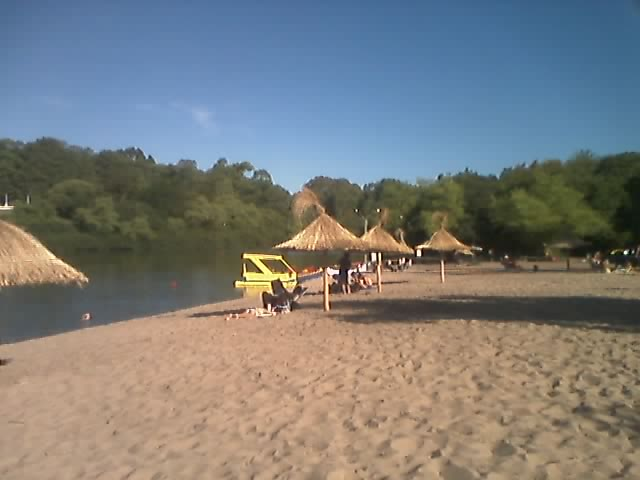
Beach El Sauzal

The departament is located in the center of the country, it is bordered by the Department of Flores, Florida, Río Negro, Tacuarembó, Cerro Largo and Treinta y Tres.

The tourism in the department offers various veins: massive cultural artistic activities (such as Pilsen Rock, Festival de folclore, Llamadas, Movida tropical, etc.), tourism of camping and beach on the Yí River, tourism of estancias and tourism in relation to historical, architectural or other heritage. These veins it complement because, for example, visitors arriving to the Pilsen Rock or the festival de folclore also usually concur to camping and/or the beach.

The mentioned camping is called "33 Orientales", is located in beach El Sauzal on the shores of Yí River, and has a dense native forest.

From the point of view of heritage tourism are highlighted the cave paintings nearby streams Maestre Campo and Chamangá and the Chapel Farruco, one of the oldest colonial buildings of Uruguay.

=== Tacuarembó ===
At north of the country, is the most widespread department of Uruguay. In it, it highlight the Iporá Resort and Valle Edén, near the city of Tacuarembó, and San Gregorio de Polanco, with its murals, made by some of the most important Uruguayan artists, and its sandy beach on shores of Artificial Lake Rincón de Bonete. Valle Edén attracts a special attraction for visitors in search of the birthplace of Carlos Gardel.

=== Rivera ===
Rivera is located north of the Uruguay, is a department that is in a big commercial boom, its main source of tourism is shopping tourism, based on duty-free shops; there are currently approximately 70 duty-free shops in the city and in 2012 a shopping mall, Siñeriz Shopping, was opened. Two more shopping malls are scheduled to begin construction. In the department there is also ecotourism, such as the Lunarejo, which was recently named Protected Area.

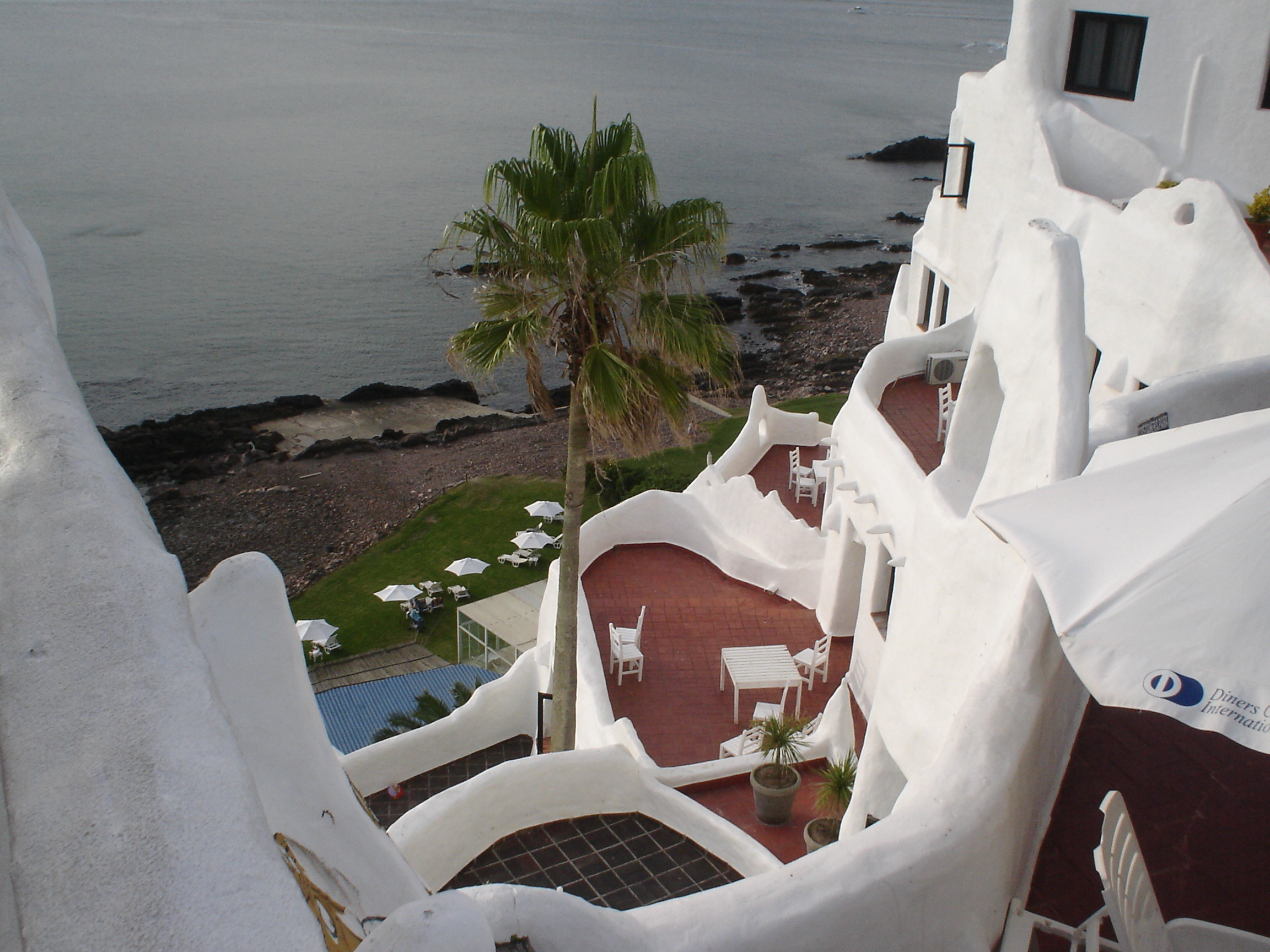
Carlos Páez Vilaró's Casapueblo

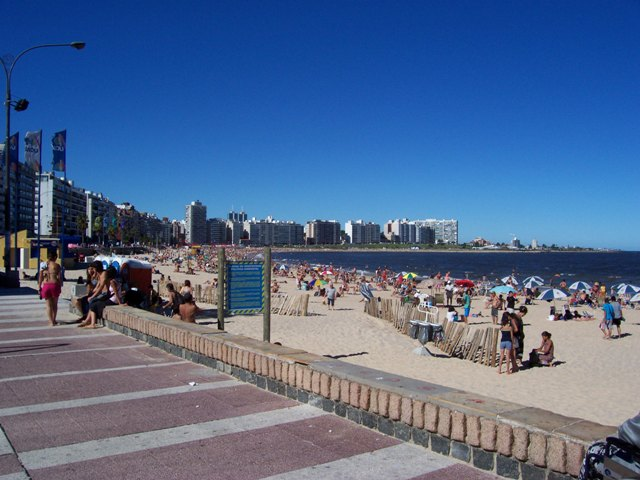
Pocitos Beach, Montevideo

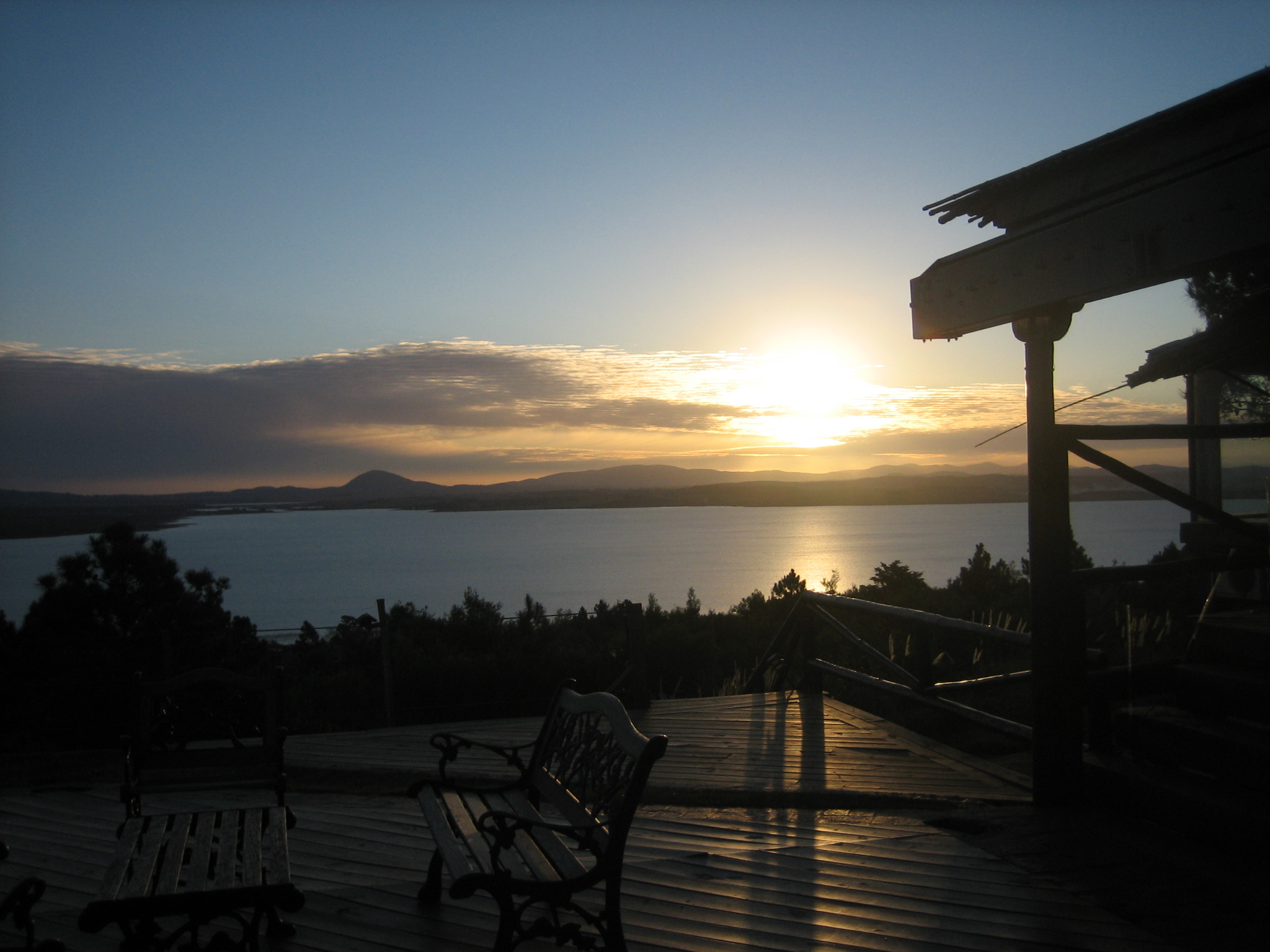
Laguna del Sauce

== Ethical travel ==
Uruguay was included in both the 2011 and the 2012 lists of "The Developing World's 10 Best Ethical Destinations". This ranking was produced by Ethical Traveler magazine based on metrics such as environmental protection, social welfare, and human rights.

== Retirement in Uruguay ==
Publications such as the Huffington Post recommend Uruguay as a destination for people wishing to retire in peace and enjoyment, and paying reasonable taxes.

== See also ==
- Visa policy of Uruguay
