= Auxiliadora =

Auxiliadora is a Spanish and Portuguese female name. It refers to Mary Help of Christians (Spanish: María Auxiliadora). It can also refer to:

People

- María Auxiliadora Delgado, First Lady of Uruguay
- Auxiliadora Jiménez, Spanish footballer

Geography

- Auxiliadora, Rio Grande do Sul, a neighbourhood of Porto Alegre, Rio Grande do Sul, Brazil
- María Auxiliadora, Distrito Nacional, a neighbourhood of Santo Domingo, Dominican Republic
- María Auxiliadora, Guanajuato, a town in Guanajuato, Mexico

Churches

- María Auxiliadora, Montevideo, a Roman Catholic church in the neighbourhood of Parque Rodó, Montevideo, Uruguay
- María Auxiliadora, Colón, Montevideo, a Roman Catholic church in the neighbourhood of Villa Colón, Montevideo, Uruguay

Schools

- Colegio María Auxiliadora, a school in Carolina, Puerto Rico
- Liceo María Auxiliadora, a high school in Santa Cruz, Colchagua Province, Chile
