= Maximiliano Pereira =

Maximiliano Pereira is the name of:

- Maximiliano Pereira (footballer, born 1984), Uruguayan footballer
- Maximiliano Pereira (footballer, born 1993), Uruguayan footballer

== See also ==
- Maximiliano Pereiro (born 1990), Uruguayan footballer
