= Barrio Jardín, Montevideo =

Barrio Jardín
- Pocket neighbourhood
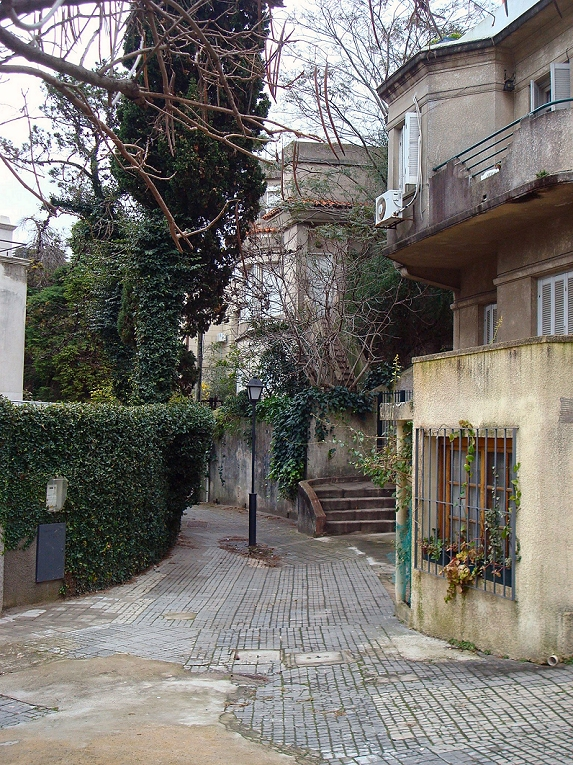
- Interactive map of Barrio Jardín
- Coordinates: 34°54′54″S 56°9′58″W
- Country: Uruguay
- Department: Montevideo Department
- City: Montevideo

Barrio Jardín is a small neighbourhood of Montevideo, Uruguay, which is part of Barrio Parque Rodó. It was formerly known as "Parque del Pueblo". It is delimited by España Boulevard to its north, 21 de Setiembre Avenue to its south and west, and Artigas Boulevard to its east. Directly to the north is situated the Faculty of Architecture of the University of the Republic, while to its east is the barrio Pocitos.

The park area of Parque Rodó starts directly to its south, with the Defensor Sporting Club, the Parque Rodó Infantil, and the National Museum of Visual Arts just across its southern limits. On the side facing Artigas Boulevard is also situated a villa housing the Embassy of Japan.

== Architecture ==
The architectural concept of the neighbourhood was developed by Eugenio Baroffio in the 1920s. Baroffio designed the area influenced by European modernist architecture. In 1936, architect Gonzalo Vázquez Barriére built a set of buildings that shared features of Art Deco: curves, porthole windows, rounded stairs and balconies. The residences are located on a terrain of different reliefs, and blocks, streets, and passages are curved.

== Other places with the same name in Montevideo ==
Barrio Jardín is also the name of a district in barrio Sayago, delimited by the streets Quicuyó, Tacuabé, and Gabriel Velazco.
