= Colón Sudeste =

Colón Sudeste–Abayubá
- Barrio
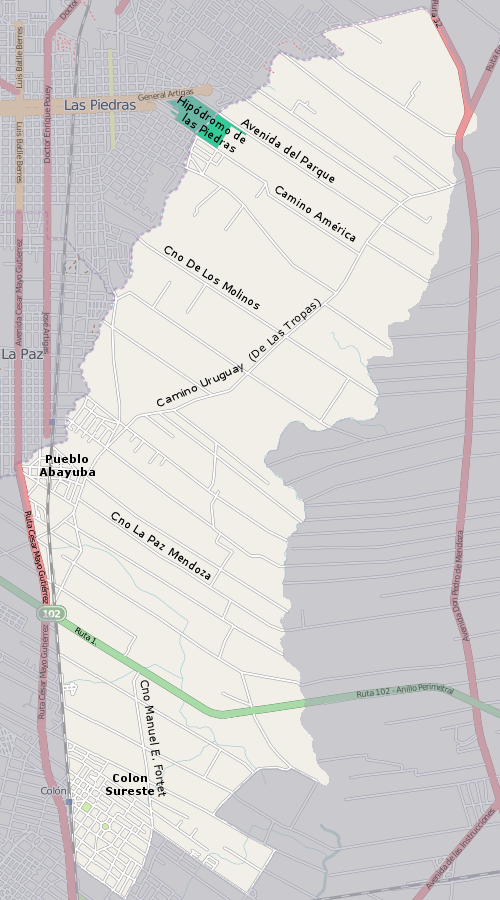
- Street map of Colón Sudeste–Abayubá

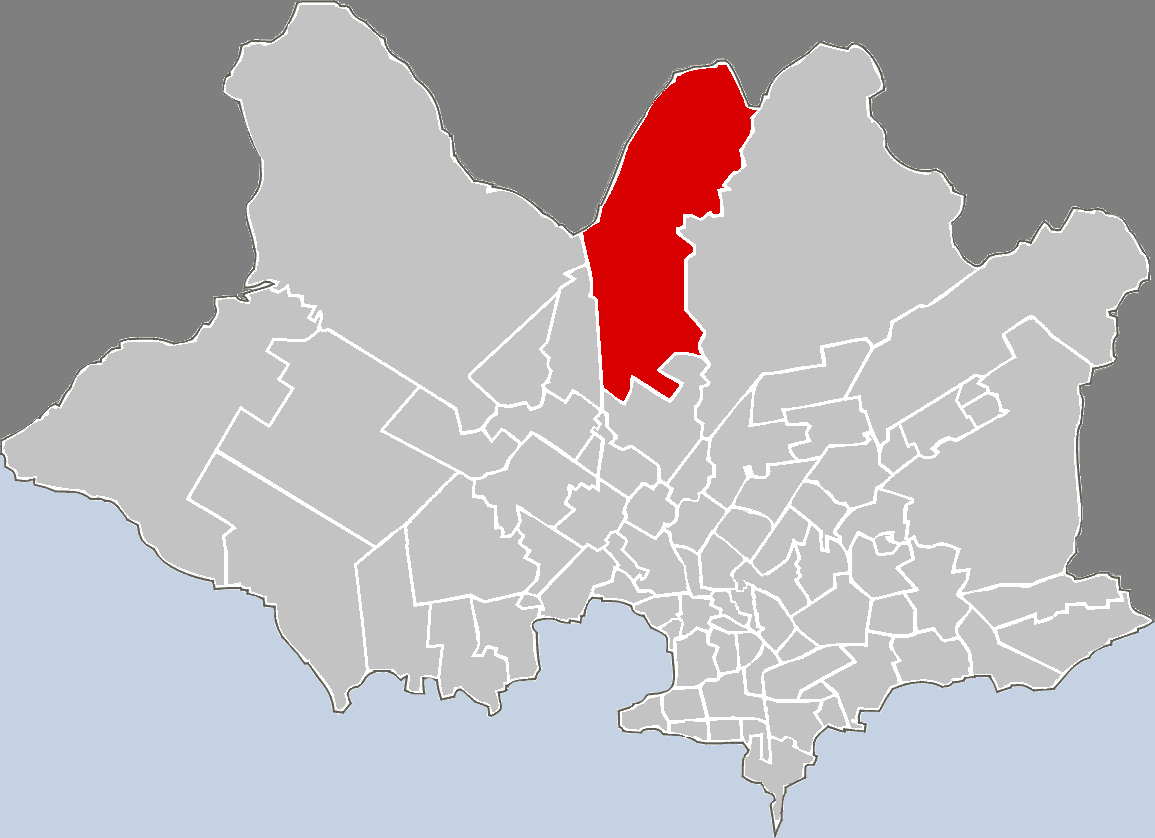
- Location of Colón Sudeste–Abayubá in Montevideo
- Coordinates: 34°47′46″S 56°12′23″W
- Country: Uruguay
- Department: Montevideo Department
- City: Montevideo
- Time zone: UTC -3
- Postal code: 12400
- Area code: +598 2 (+7 digits)

Colón Sudeste–Abayubá is a composite barrio (neighbourhood or district) of Montevideo, Uruguay.

== Geography ==
This barrio borders Lezica–Melilla and Colón Centro y Noroeste to the west, Canelones Department to the northwest and north, Manga–Toledo Chico to the east, and Peñarol–Lavalleja to the south.

Pueblo Abayubá is a town belonging to the Montevideo Department and one of the few populated areas of this department whose population was not included in the count of the city of Montevideo. It is a town that belongs to the southern suburbs of La Paz of the Canelones Department.

== Population ==
In 2004, its population was 924.

Year	Population
1975	673
1985	815
1996	873
2004	924

Source: Instituto Nacional de Estadística de Uruguay

- Coordinates of Pueblo Abauba: 34°46′13″S 56°13′16″W

== Places of worship ==
- Parish Church of St Mary Mother of the Church and St John Bosco, Av. Garzón 2024 (Roman Catholic, Salesians of Don Bosco)

== See also ==
- Barrios of Montevideo
