= Maximiliano Pereira (footballer, born 1993) =

Uruguayan footballer (1993–2020)

Personal information
- Full name: Maximiliano Rodrigo Pereira Cardozo
- Date of birth: 25 April 1993
- Place of birth: Montevideo, Uruguay
- Date of death: 26 December 2020 (aged 27)
- Place of death: Minas, Uruguay
- Height: 1.82 m (6 ft 0 in)
- Position: Defender

Senior career*
Years	Team	Apps	(Gls)
2011–2015	Cerro	31	(0)
2015–2016	Miramar Misiones	12	(2)
2016–2018	Racing de Montevideo	49	(0)
2018–2019	Sport Boys	46	(4)
2019	Deportivo Santaní	8	(0)
2020	Liverpool	1	(0)
2020	Central Español	13	(1)
Total		160	(7)
- * Club domestic league appearances and goals

Maximiliano Rodrigo Pereira Cardozo (25 April 1993 – 26 December 2020) was an Uruguayan professional footballer who played as a defender.

== Career ==
Born in Montevideo, Pereira played for Cerro, Miramar Misiones, Racing de Montevideo, Sport Boys, Deportivo Santaní, Liverpool and Central Español.

He accidentally drowned at the Salto del Penitente in Minas.
