= María Auxiliadora, Montevideo =

Roman Catholic parish church in Parque Rodó, Montevideo, Uruguay

María Auxiliadora (Talleres Don Bosco)
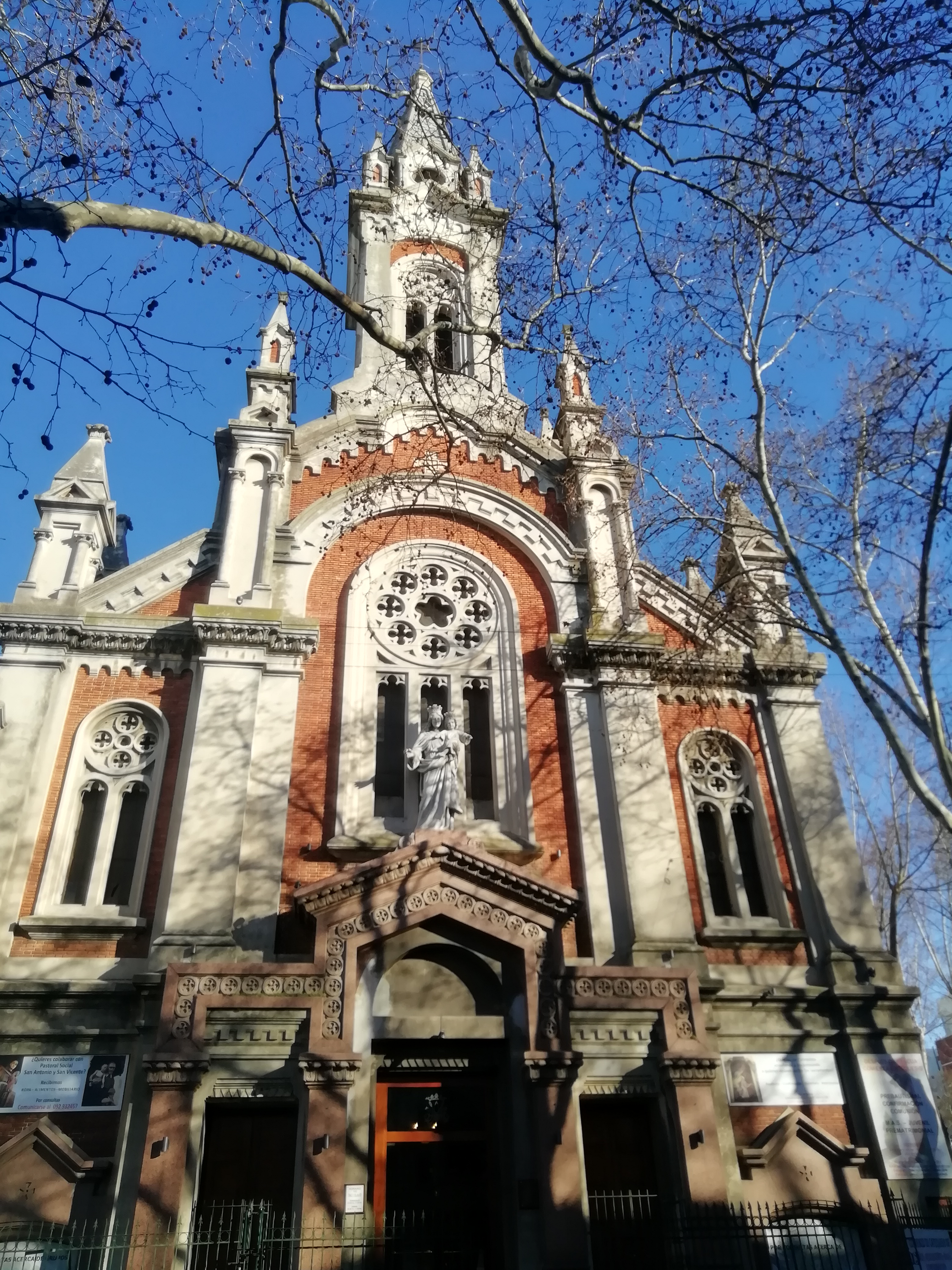

Religion
- Affiliation: Roman Catholic
- Ecclesiastical or organizational status: Parish church

Location
- Location: Joaquin de Salterain 1156; Montevideo, Uruguay

Architecture
- Type: Church

The Iglesia María Auxiliadora (English: Church of Mary Help of Christians) is a Roman Catholic parish church in the neighbourhood of Parque Rodó, Montevideo, Uruguay. The parish was established on 22 October 1919.

The church is dedicated to Mary Help of Christians, a Marian devotion deeply held and propagated by Saint John Bosco (Don Bosco).

The temple is part of a larger complex, including "Talleres Don Bosco", a private technical school which occupies a whole block, operated by the Salesians of Don Bosco since its establishment in 1893.

The parish is one of seven in Uruguay dedicated to Mary Help of Christians, including María Auxiliadora in Montevideo's Lezica neighbourhood, as well as churches in other municipalities around the country (Casupá, Castillos, General Enrique Martínez, Guichón and Vichadero).
