= Fernando O. Assunção =

Uruguayan historian (1931–2006)

Fernando Octavio Assunção Formica (12 January 1931 in Montevideo – 3 May 2006 in São Paulo) was a Uruguayan historian, anthropologist, scholar, historian, and writer.

He specialized in social anthropology, writing works about Uruguayan folklore and the Gaucho. He was a member of the Historical and Geographical Institute of Uruguay and the Pan American Institute of Geography and History.

== Works ==
- Génesis del tipo gaucho en el Río de la Plata (1957).
- Usos y costumbres del gaucho.
- Romancero oriental.
- El mate (Bolsilibros Arca, 1967).
- Pilchas criollas (1976, reeditado por Emecé en 1997). ISBN 950-04-1121-0.
- Artigas, Inauguración de su Mausoleo y Glosario de Homenajes (en colaboración con Wilfredo Pérez).
- El perro cimarrón.
- Tradición, factor de integración cultural del individuo en la comunidad.
- De Uruguay, América y el Mundo.
- "Cuadernos del Boston", serie sobre los barrios de Montevideo, 1990–1993, en colaboración con Iris Bombet Franco:
  - 1. La Ciudad Vieja,
  - 2. La Aguada,
  - 3. La Unión,
  - 4. Pocitos,
  - 5. 18 de Julio,
  - 6. Colón.
- Uruguay, lo mejor de lo nuestro (con fotografías de Julio Testoni).
- El tango y sus circunstancias (El Ateneo, Buenos Aires).
- Colonia del Sacramento, Patrimonio Mundial (coautoría con Antonio Cravotto, prólogo de Federico Mayor Zaragoza, introducción de Marta Canessa de Sanguinetti; Ediciones UNESCO, Montevideo, 1996).
- Epopeya y tragedia de Manuel de Lobo. Biografía del fundador de Colonia del Sacramento (1635–1683) (Linardi y Risso, 2003).
- Historia del gaucho (Claridad, 2006). ISBN 978-950-620-205-7.
- El caballo criollo (Emecé, Buenos Aires, 2008).
- Bailes criollos rioplatenses (con Olga Fernández Latour de Botas y Beatriz Durante, Claridad, 2012).
