= María Auxiliadora, Colón, Montevideo =

Roman Catholic parish church in Villa Colón, Montevideo, Uruguay

María Auxiliadora (Colegio Pío)
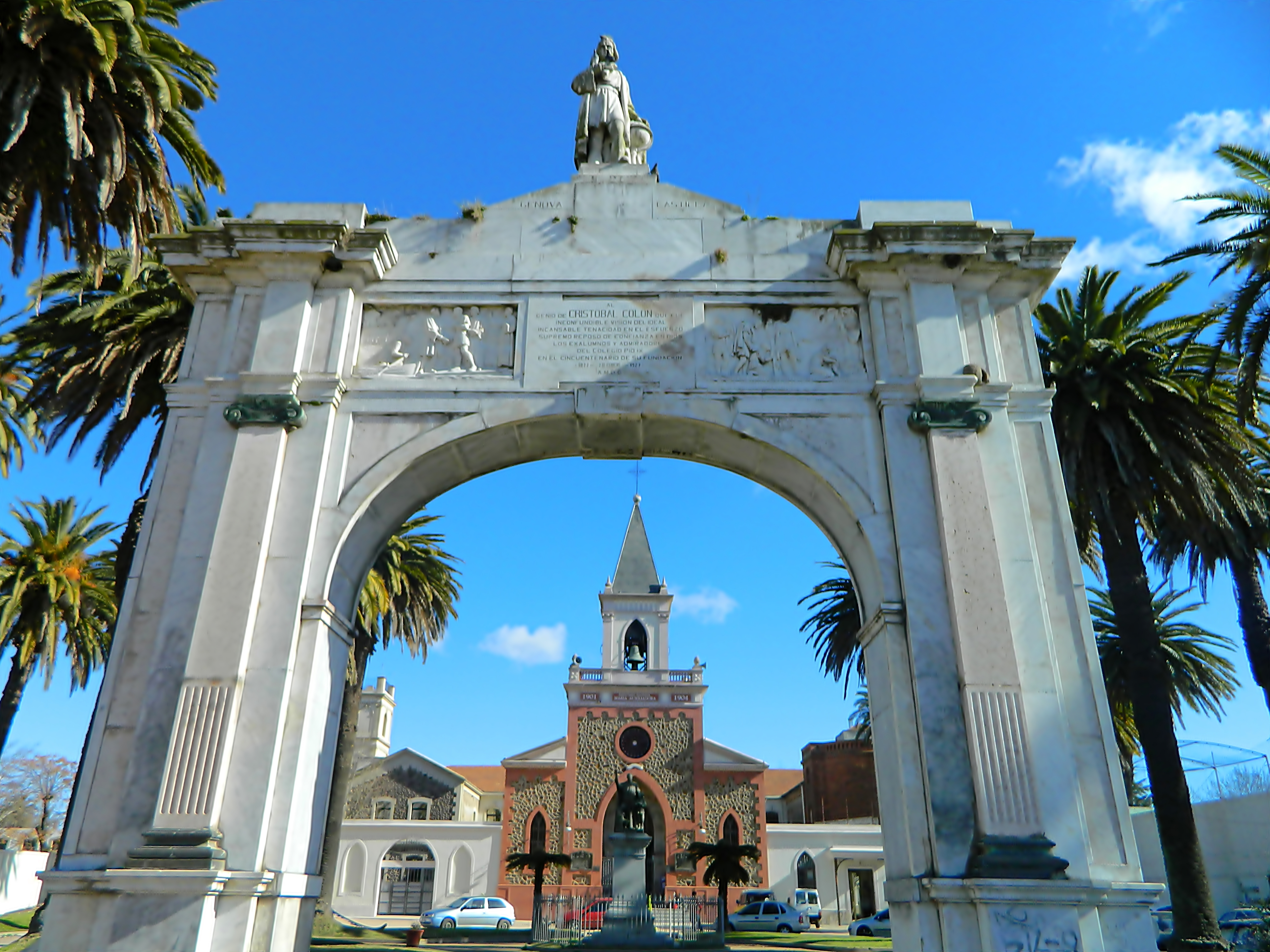
- Entrance to the church with statue of Christopher Columbus.

Religion
- Affiliation: Roman Catholic
- Ecclesiastical or organizational status: Parish church
- Year consecrated: 1877

Location
- Location: Av. Lezica 6375; Montevideo, Uruguay
- Interactive map of María Auxiliadora (Colegio Pío)
- Coordinates: 34°47′47″S 56°14′58″W

Architecture
- Type: Church

The Iglesia María Auxiliadora (English: Church of Mary Help of Christians) is a Roman Catholic parish church in Villa Colón, Montevideo, Uruguay. The church was completed in 1877.

The church is dedicated to Mary Help of Christians, a Marian devotion deeply held and propagated by Saint John Bosco (Don Bosco). The temple was declared a National Votive Sanctuary by Archbishop Mariano Soler, who blessed it personally in 1901.

The temple is part of a larger complex dominated by the private school "Colegio Pío IX", operated by the Salesians of Don Bosco since its establishment in the second half of the 19th century.

The parish is one of seven in Uruguay dedicated to Mary Help of Christians, including María Auxiliadora in Montevideo's Parque Rodó neighbourhood, as well as churches in other municipalities around the country (Casupá, Castillos, General Enrique Martínez, Guichón and Vichadero).
