= Colón Centro y Noroeste =

- Barrio
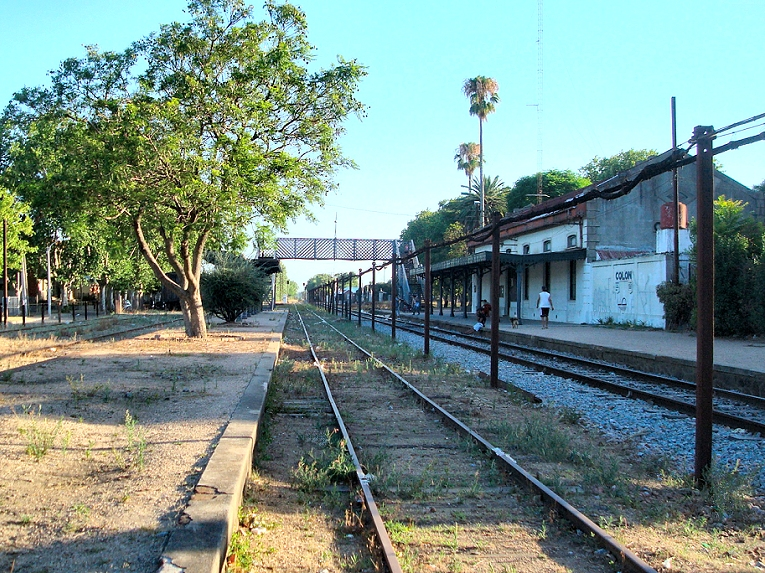
- The Train Station in Colón

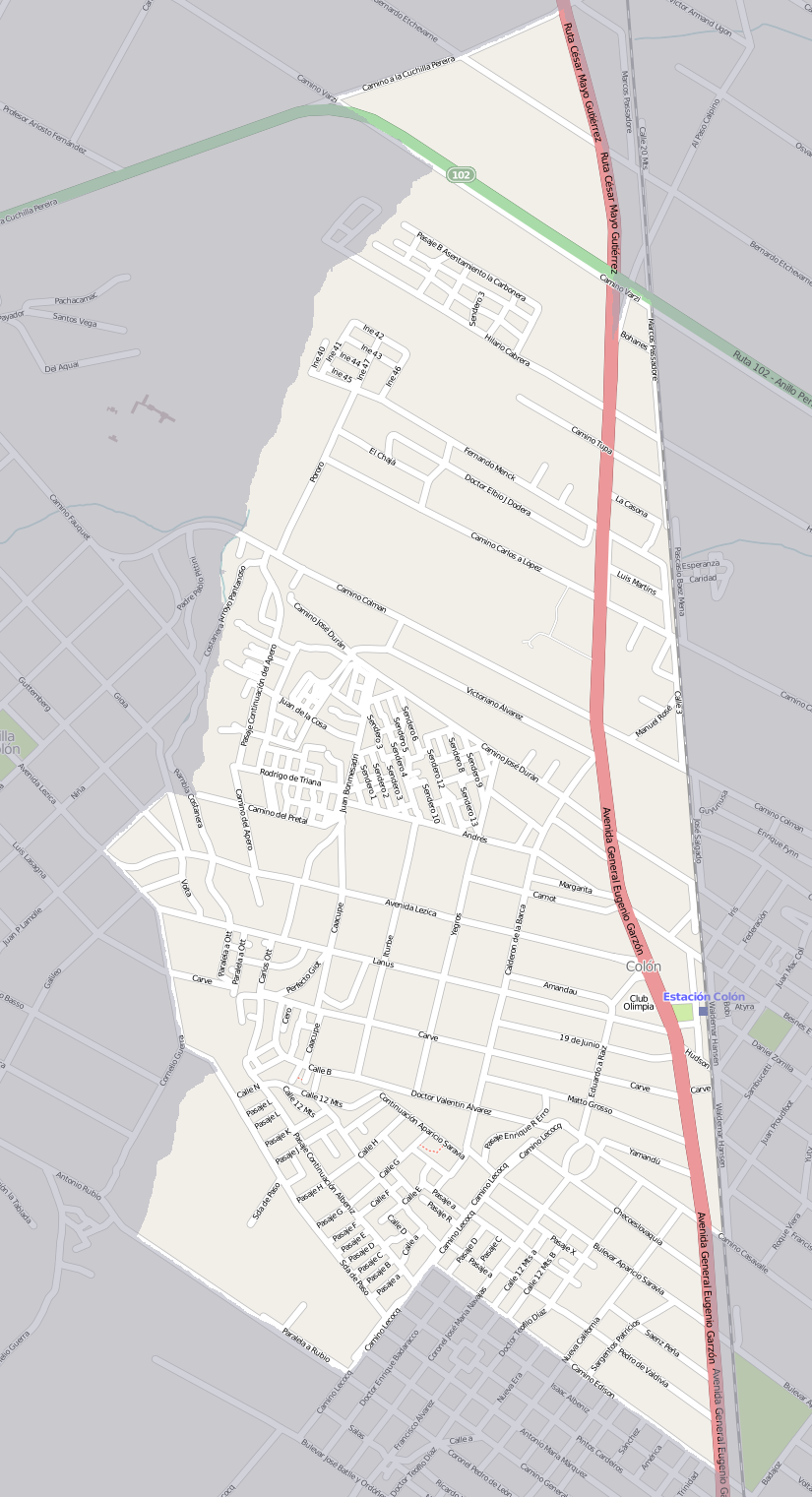
- Street map of Colón Centro y Noroeste

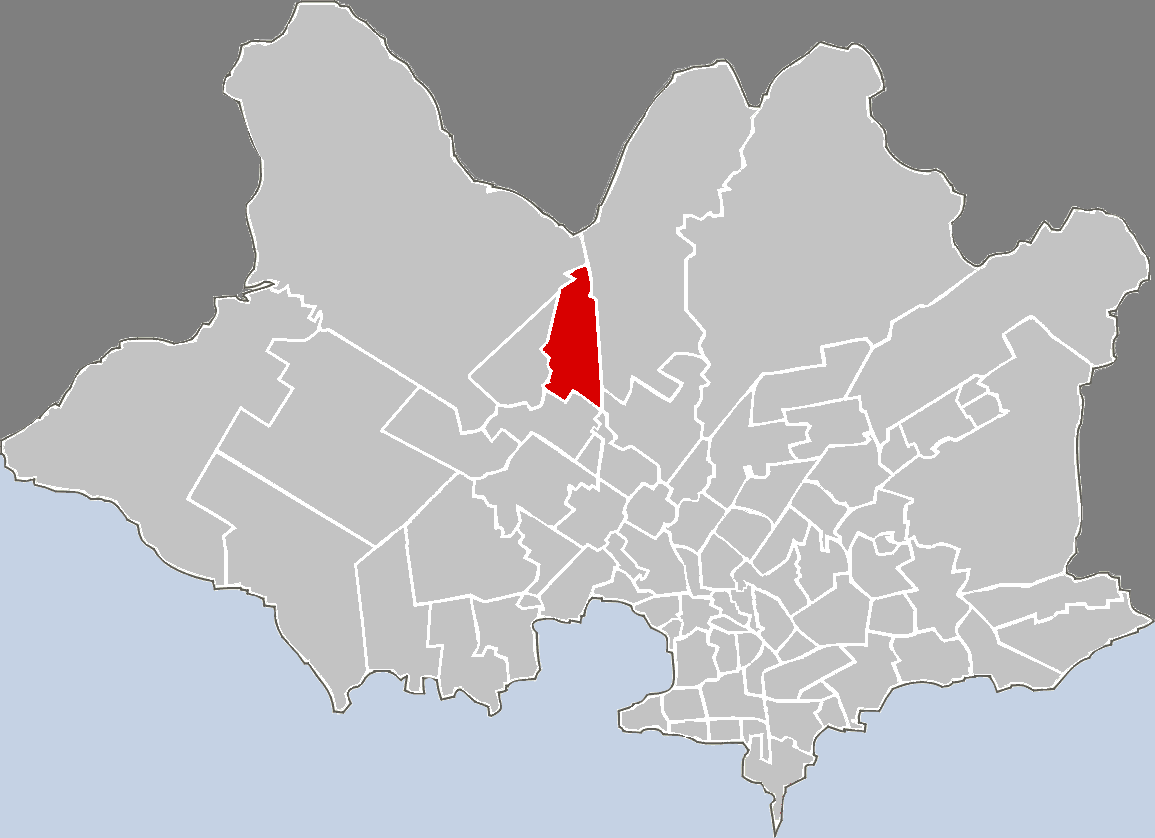
- Location of Colón in Montevideo
- Coordinates: 34°48′16″S 56°13′46″W
- Country: Uruguay
- Department: Montevideo Department
- City: Montevideo

Colón Centro y Noroeste is a barrio (neighbourhood or district) of Montevideo, Uruguay.

== Location ==
It borders Lezica / Melilla to the west and northwest, Colón Sudeste / Abayubá to the east and northeast, Peñarol / Lavalleja to the southeast, Conciliación and Sayago to the south.

== See also ==
- Barrios of Montevideo

== Bibliography ==
- Assunção, Fernando O.; Bombet Franco, Iris (1993). Colón. Cuadernos del Boston (in Spanish). Vol. 6. Montevideo.
