= Maximiliano Pereiro =

Uruguayan footballer (born 1990)

Personal information
- Full name: Maximilliano Pereiro Zugarramurdi
- Date of birth: 17 August 1990 (age 36)
- Place of birth: Montevideo, Uruguay
- Height: 1.78 m (5 ft 10 in)
- Position: Centre back

Team information
- Current team: Albion
- Number: 2

Senior career*
| Years | Team | Apps | (Gls) |
| 2010–2012 | Rampla Juniors | 23 | (0) |
| 2012–2016 | Sud América | 70 | (0) |
| 2016–2017 | Guillermo Brown | 7 | (0) |
| 2017–2019 | Sud América | 4 | (0) |
| 2019– | Albion | 33 | (0) |
- * Club domestic league appearances and goals as of 20:21, 30 November 2020 (UTC)

Maximiliano Pereiro Zugarramurdi (born 17 August 1990 in Montevideo) is a Uruguayan football player who plays for Albion FC.

== Career ==
Pereiro, the 1.78-meter tall defender played in a total of 23 games for Rampla Juniors in the Primera División across the 2010–11 and 2011–12 seasons; he did not score any goals in either season. He was then transferred into the second list in Sud América, but rose from the Segunda División to the highest Uruguayan league at the end of the 2012–13 season. In the following Premier Season he participated in 26 league games. During the current 2015–16 season until now (2 February 2016) he has played in 15 Premier League games. He has not been succeeded by anyone in the first league in Sud América.
