= Piedra Pintada =

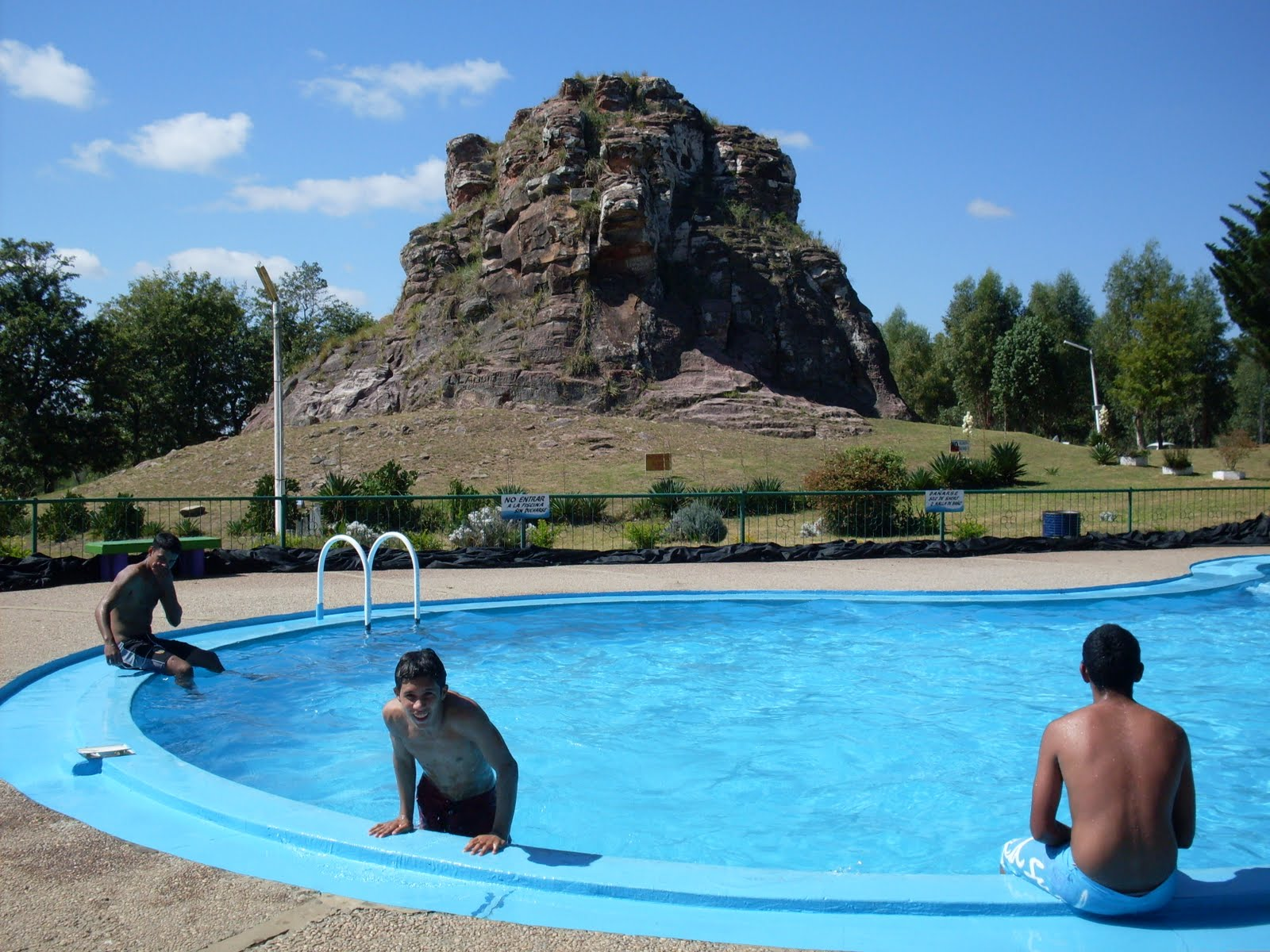

Piedra Pintada ("Painted Stone") is a sandstone formation 19 metres (62 ft) high and 76 metres (249 ft) in circumference, which is unique in the area and considered a geological curiosity. It is located in the Artigas Department of northern Uruguay, 17 kilometres (11 mi) southeast of Artigas and 8 kilometres (5.0 mi) from Ruta 30, in a park named "Parque Congreso de Abril".

The red-green color of the "Piedra Pintada", which gives its name, is due to the existence of different species of mosses that have adhered to the giant mass of sandstone. Water has eroded the sandstone, but in its higher parts, the basaltic rocks is more resistant to erosion. It is a combination "type" between the basalt that forms the bulk soil and sandstone, which forms the subsoil around the city of Artigas.

Its picturesque sight attracts many visitors to the area. The "Parque Congreso de Abril", opened in 1982, located next to it has a camping area with toilets, running water, electricity, swimming pools and typical barbecue pits for the public, and there is a cantine and firewood for sale.

There is also a small Wildlife Ecological Reserve at the entrance of the park with native species that have disappeared in Uruguay.
