= Basilica of Mary Help of Christians, Lima =

Basilica in Lima, Peru

Coordinates: 12.0610°S 77.0429°W

Basilica of Mary Help of Christians
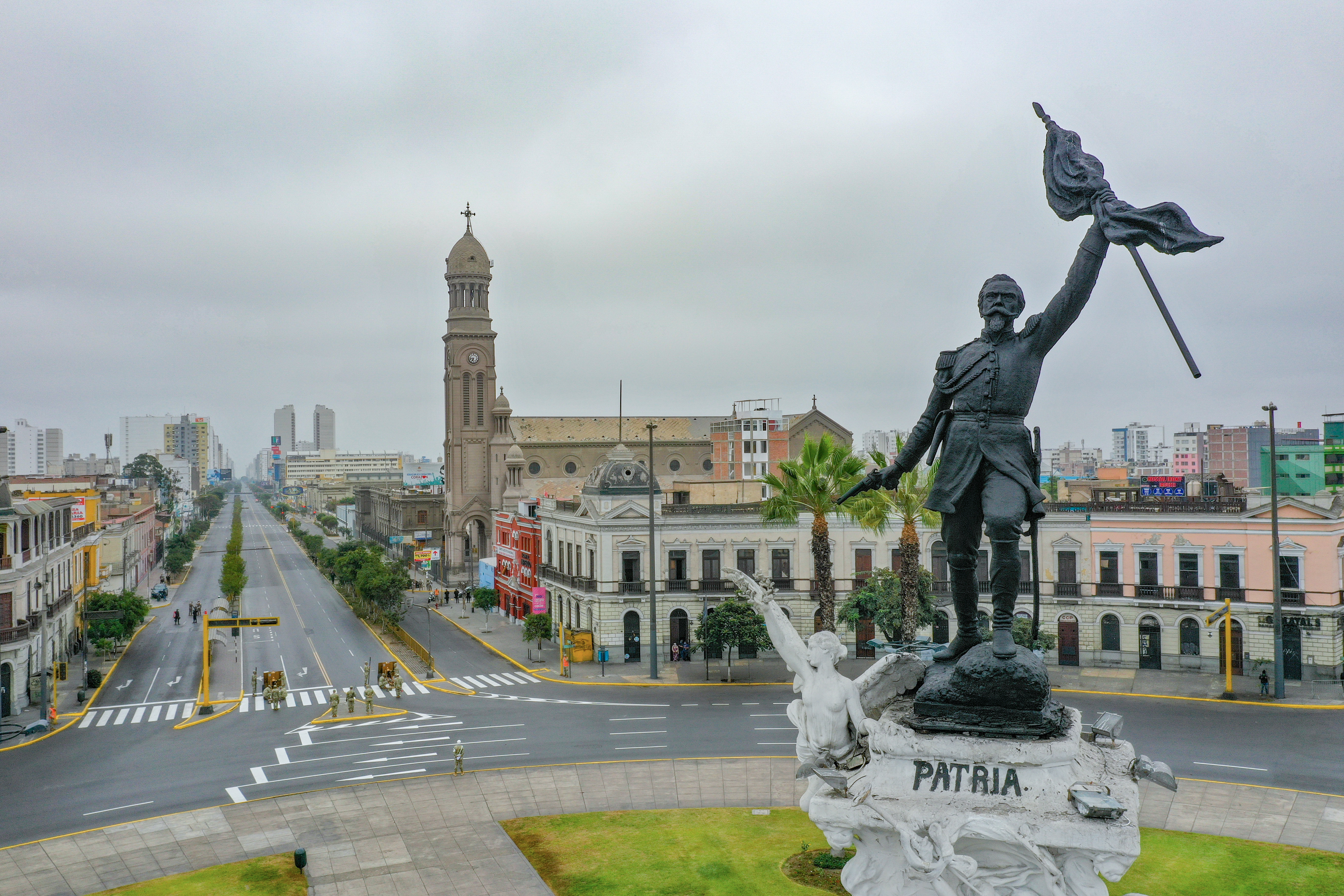
- View from Bolognesi Square
- Basilica of Mary Help of Christians
- Location: Lima
- Country: Peru
- Denomination: Roman Catholic

History
- Founded: 30 July 1921; 8 December 1924
- Founder: Augusto B. Leguía
- Dedication: Mary, Help of Christians

Architecture
- Heritage designation: Cultural heritage of Peru
- Completed: 1924

Administration
- Archdiocese: Lima

The Basilica of Mary Help of Christians (Spanish: Basílica María Auxiliadora) is a Roman Catholic Salesian church building in Breña, Lima, Peru. It faces Brazil Avenue, being located near Bolognesi Square.

== History ==
The church was built between 1916 and 1924. The incomplete building was first inaugurated by then president Augusto B. Leguía on July 30, 1921, as part of the Centennial of the Independence of Peru. It was completed and re-inaugurated on December 8, 1924, as part of the same celebration that year, dedicated to the Battle of Ayacucho. It was one of the buildings unaffected by the 1940 Lima earthquake, also resisting those of 1970 and 2007. Its decoration was completed in 2017. It was declared part of the Cultural heritage of Peru in 2021.

== See also ==
- Cultural heritage of Peru
