= Auxiliadora, Rio Grande do Sul =

Neighborhood in Porto Alegre, Brazil

Coordinates: 30°01′S 51°11′W

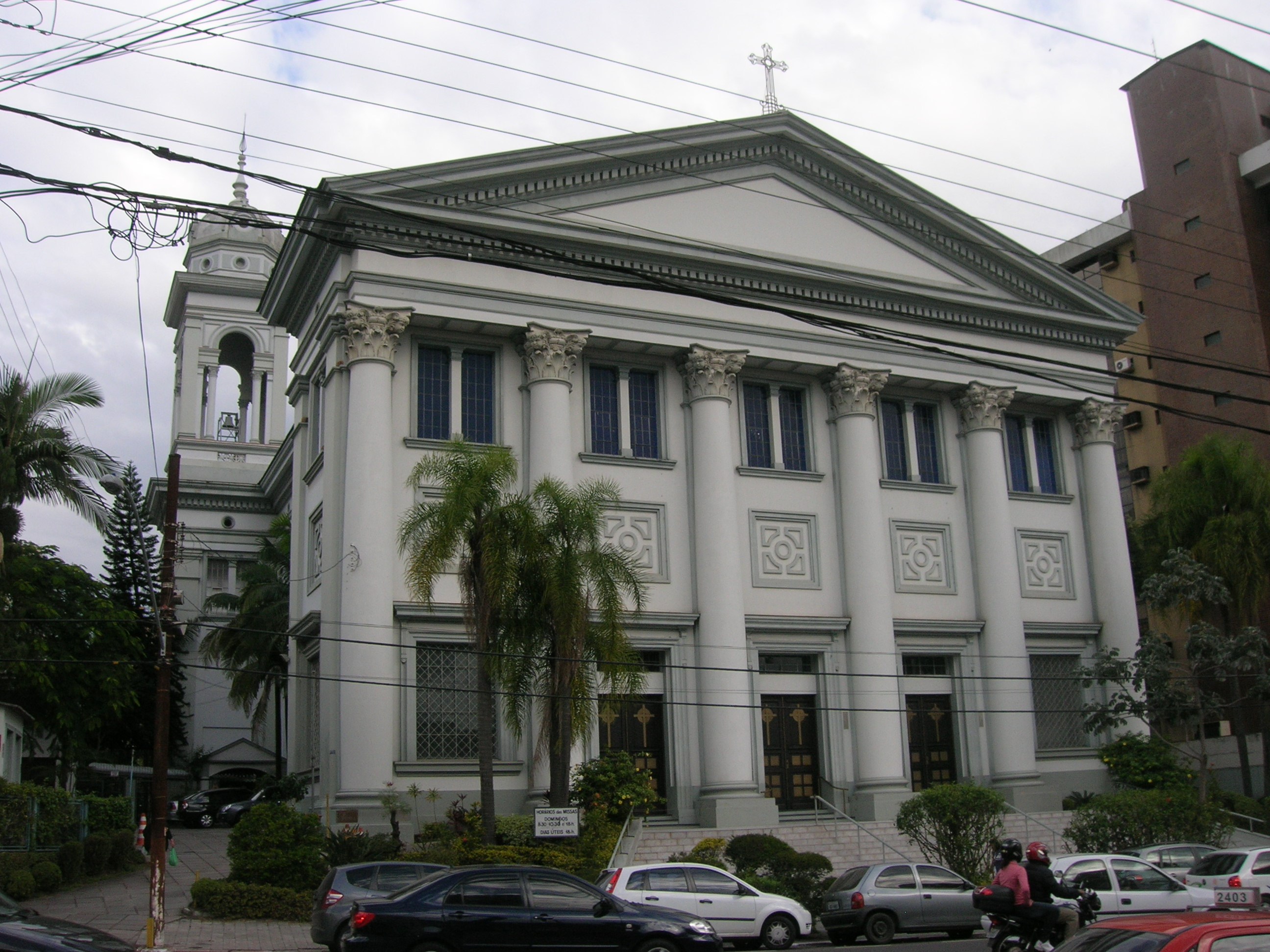
The Paróquia Nossa Senhora Auxiliadora

Auxiliadora is a neighbourhood (bairro) in the city of Porto Alegre, the state capital of Rio Grande do Sul, in Brazil. It was created by Law 2022 from December 7, 1959.

The neighbourhood was named after the Paróquia Nossa Senhora Auxiliadora, whose building, inspired in the Église de la Madeleine in Paris, was constructed in 1961.

Auxiliadora is also home to the Centro Cultural 25 de Julho, a German cultural centre.

The neighbourhood embraces people from upper middle class to upper class, mainly the streets near Moinhos de Vento, some of them that in the past belonged to Moinhos de Vento and nowadays, by the current director's plan, belong to Auxiliadora.
