= Lezica =

Lezica–Melilla
- Barrio
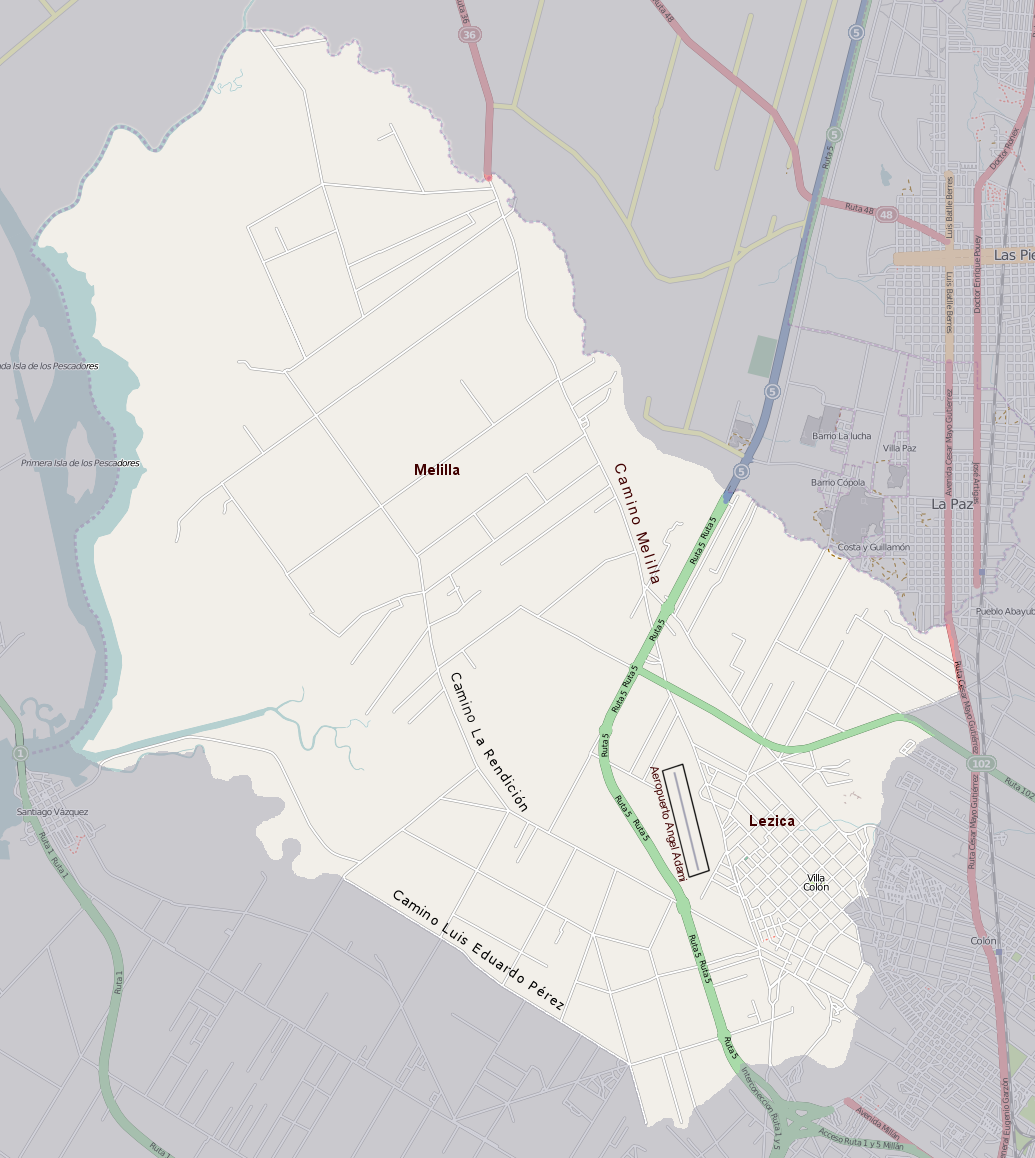
- Street map of Lezica–Melilla

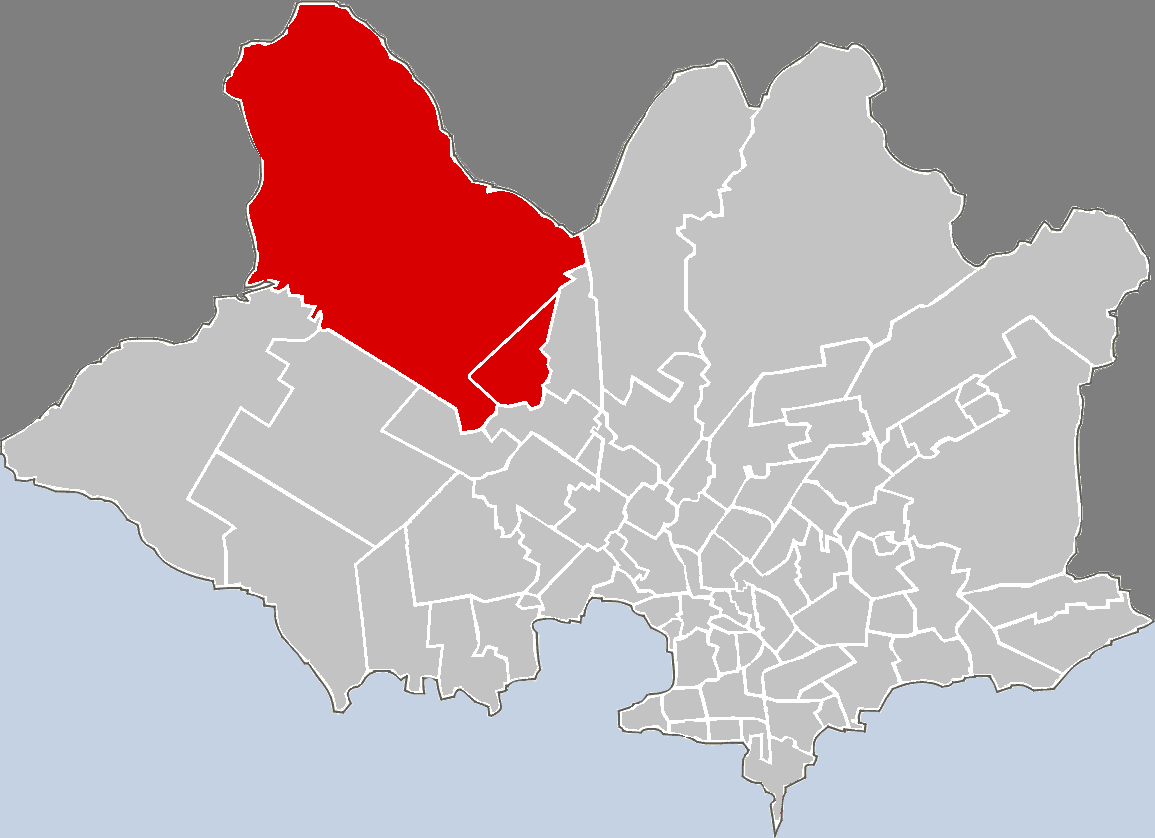
- Location of Lezica–Melilla in Montevideo
- Coordinates: 34°46′42″S 56°16′36″W
- Country: Uruguay
- Department: Montevideo Department
- City: Montevideo

Lezica–Melilla is a barrio (neighbourhood or district) of Montevideo, Uruguay.

== Location ==
This barrio borders Paso de la Arena–Los Bulevares and Conciliación to the south, San José Department to the west with Santa Lucía River forming the natural border between them, Canelones Department to the north, Colón Sudeste–Abayubá and Colón Centro y Noroeste to the east.

Lezica is the west part of Villa Colón and its main avenue is Avenida Lezica, ending at the Ángel S. Adami Airport.

== Places of worship ==
- Parish Church of Mary Help of Christians, Av. Lezica 6375; it is also a Roman Catholic pilgrimage sanctuary adjacent to the private school "Colegio Pío" (Salesians of Don Bosco)
- Parish Church of St Mary and St Pius X, Cno. Félix Buxareo 2975 bis (Roman Catholic)

== See also ==
- Barrios of Montevideo
