= Parque Rodó =

- Barrio
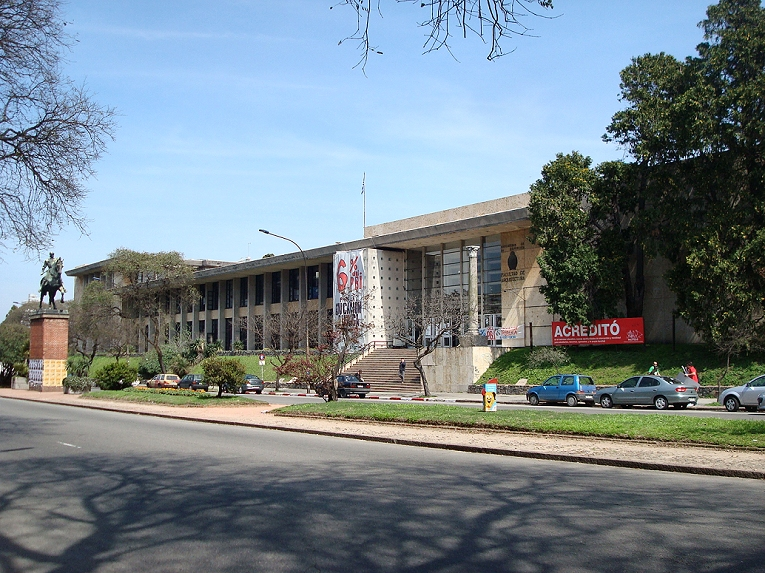
- The Faculty of Architecture in Parque Rodó

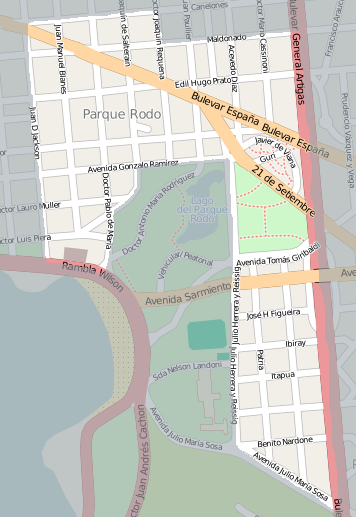
- Street map of Parque Rodo (barrio)

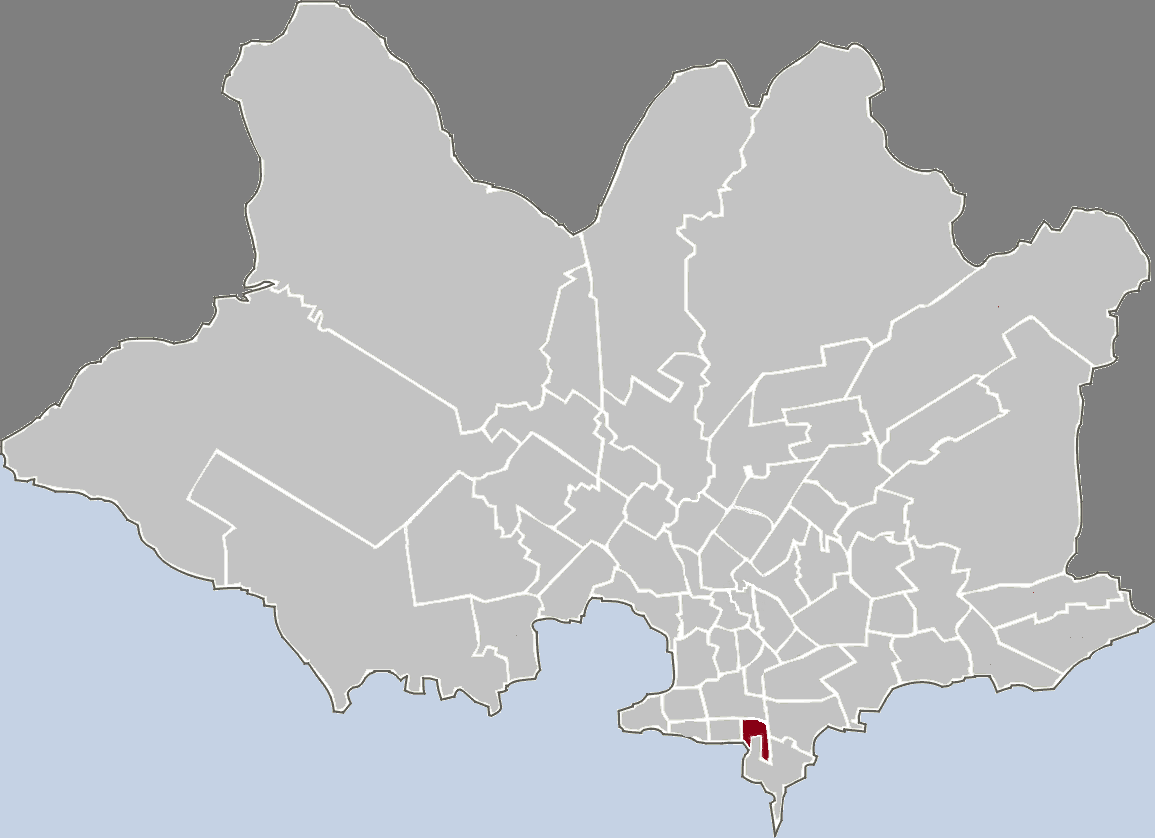
- Location of the Parque Rodó barrio in Montevideo
- Coordinates: 34°54′54″S 56°9′58″W
- Country: Uruguay
- Department: Montevideo Department
- City: Montevideo

Parque Rodó is both a barrio (neighbourhood or district) of Montevideo, Uruguay and a park which lies mostly outside the limits of the barrio itself and belongs to Punta Carretas. The name "Rodó" has been given in memory of José Enrique Rodó, an important Uruguayan writer whose monument is in the southern side of the main park.

== The park ==
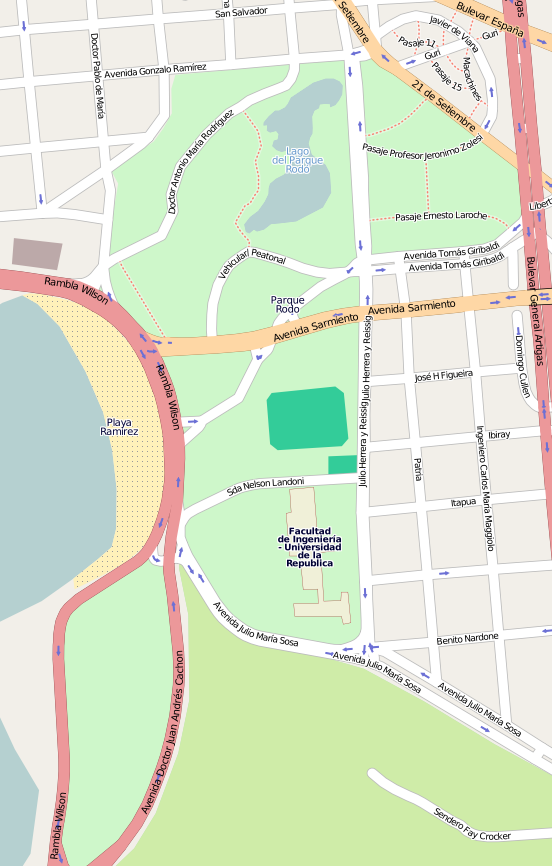
Map of the park area

On the north side of the main park is an artificial lake with a little castle housing a municipal library for children. An area to its west is used as an open-air exhibition of photography.

Apart from the main park area which is delimited by Sarmiento Avenue to the south, Parque Rodó includes an amusement park, the Estadio Luis Franzini, belonging to Defensor Sporting, the front lawn of the Faculty of Engineering, and a stripe West of the Club de Golf del Uruguay which includes the Canteras del Parque Rodó (the quarry of), the Teatro de Verano and the Lago del Parque Rodó (the lake of).

== The barrio ==
Parque Rodó barrio shares borders with Palermo to the west, Cordón to the north, Pocitos to the east and Punta Carretas to the east and south. Directly west of the main park area, is the former Parque Hotel, now the Mercosur building, which houses the Mercosur Secretariat of the Mercosur Parliament. It is also home to the Faculty of Engineering and the Faculty of Architecture of the Universidad de la República. The pocket neighbourhood Barrio Jardín is part of this barrio. On the east side of the main park area is the National Museum of visual Arts.

== Places of worship ==
- Church of Mary, Help of Christians (Roman Catholic, Salesians of Don Bosco)
- German Evangelical Congregation (German Evangelical)

== See also ==
- Barrios of Montevideo

== Images ==
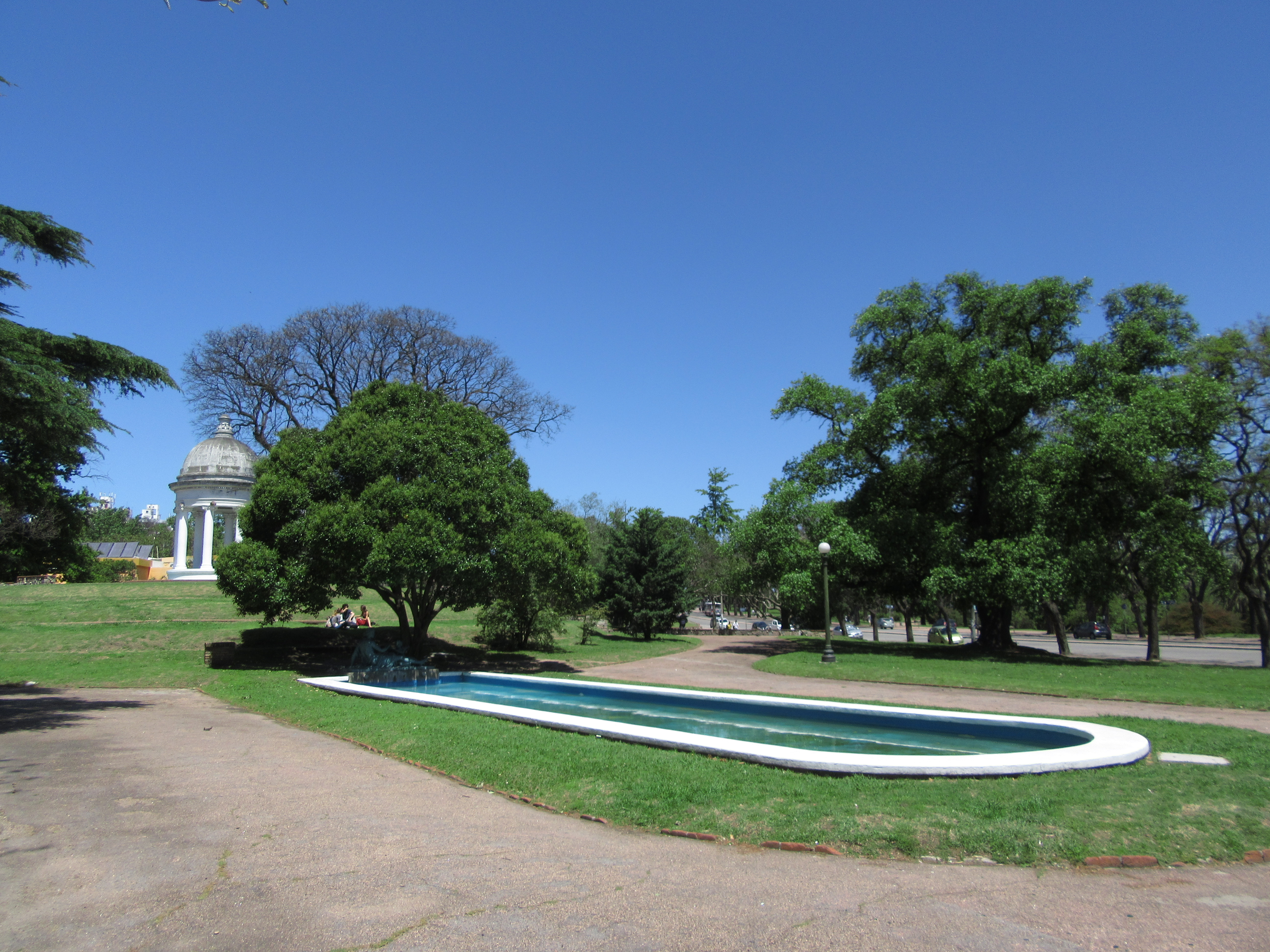
Parque Rodó

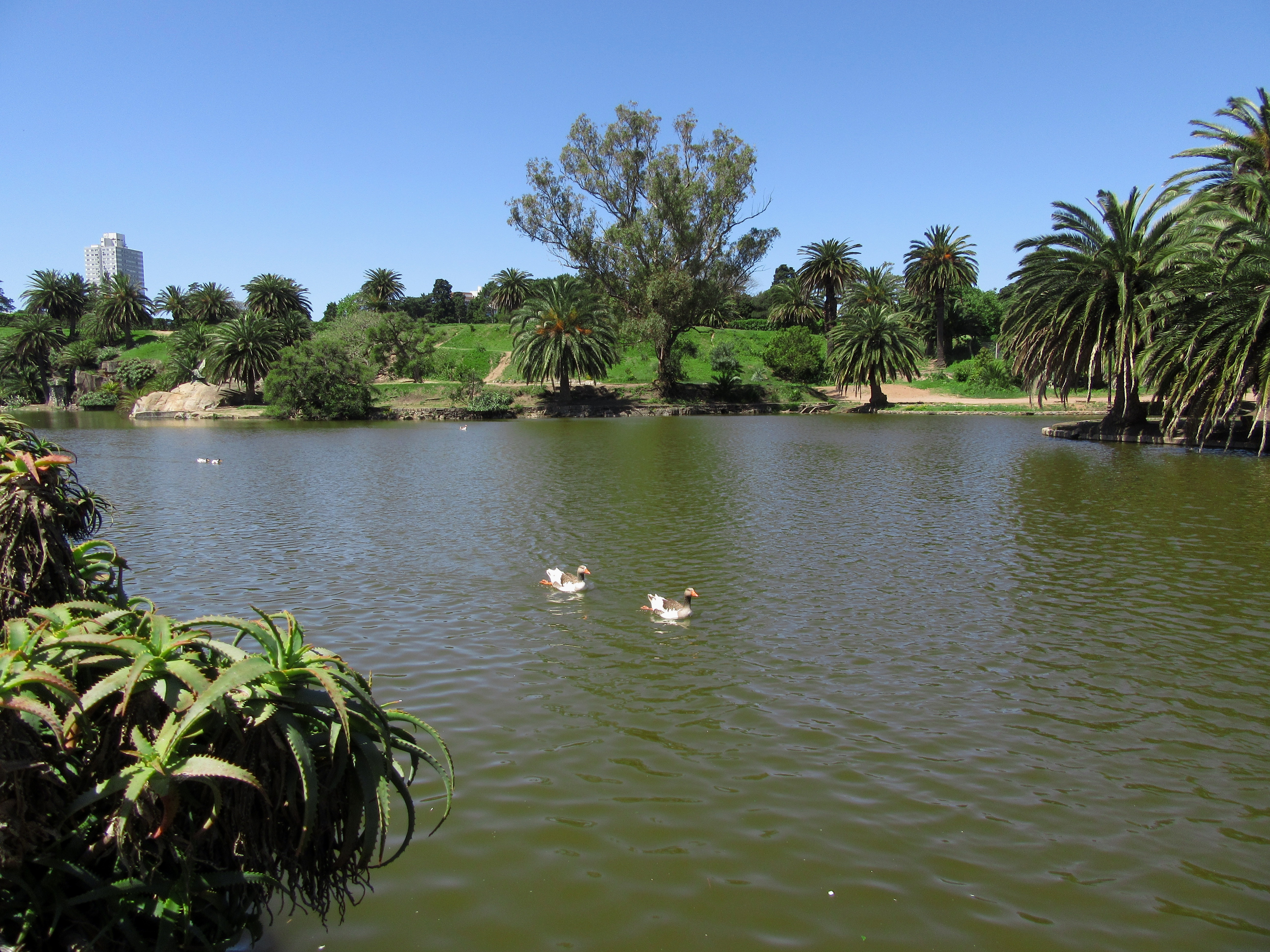
Canteras of Parque Rodó.

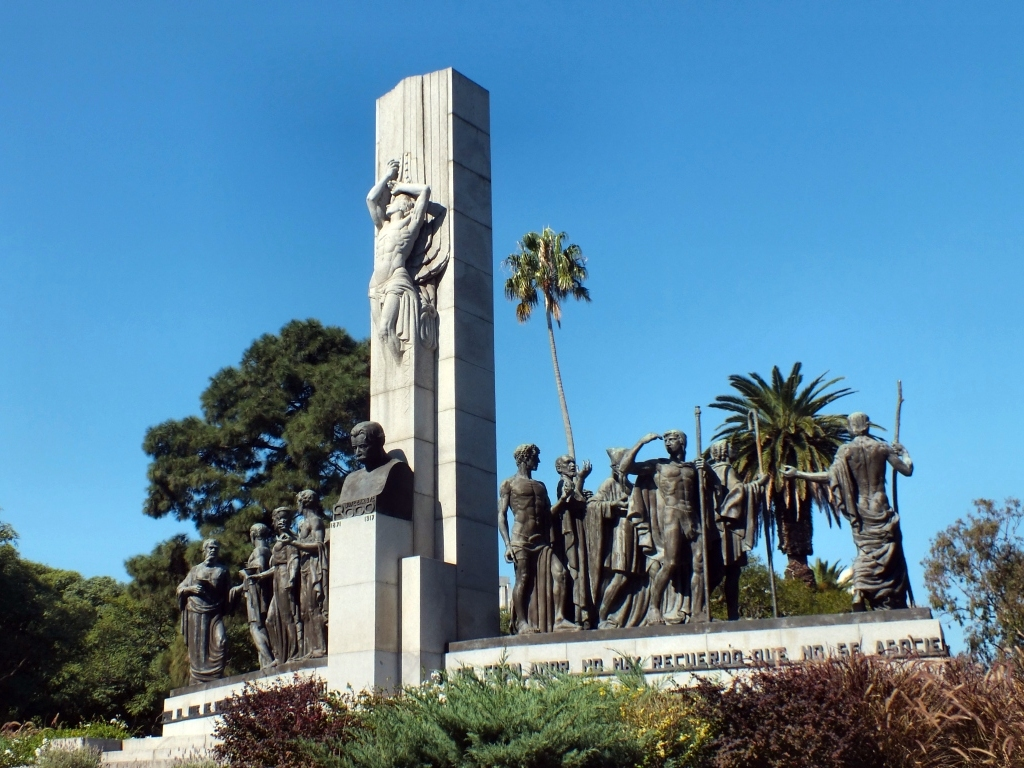
Monument to José Enrique Rodó in Parque Rodó
