= Salto del Penitente =

Coordinates: 34°22′21″S 55°03′10″W

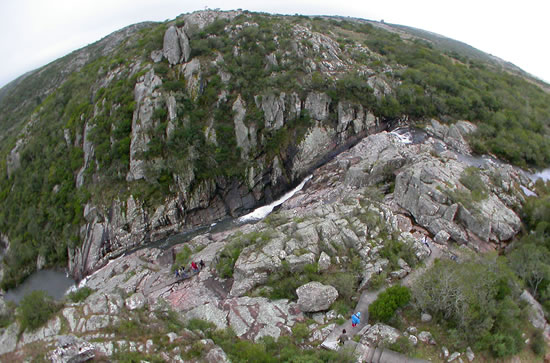
Salto del Penitente.

Salto del Penitente (Spanish for Penitent's Waterfall) is a waterfall located in Lavalleja Department, Uruguay.
