= Pocket neighborhood =

Type of planned community

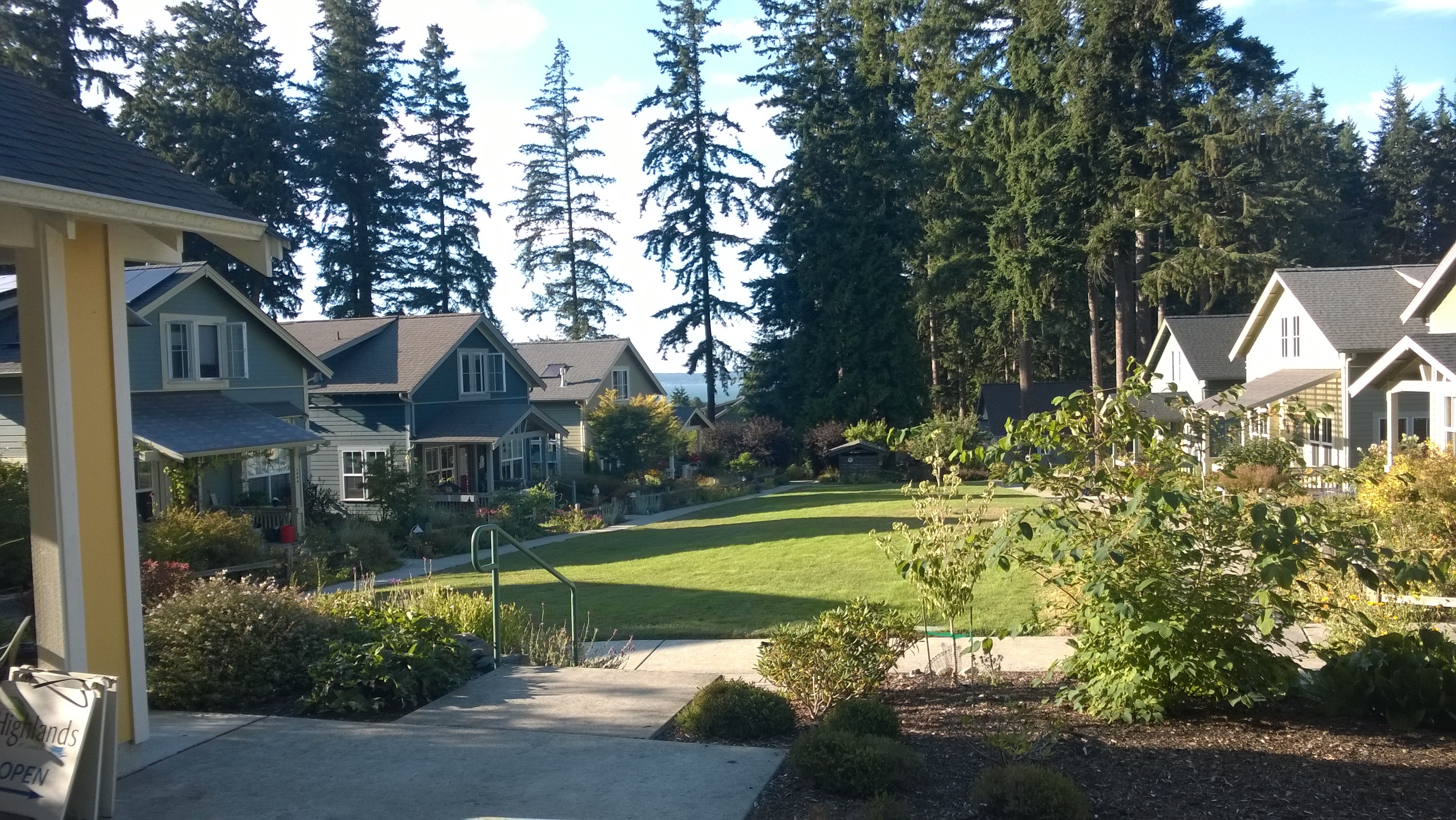
A pocket neighborhood in Langley, Washington

A pocket neighborhood is a type of planned community that consists of a grouping of smaller residences, often around a courtyard or common garden, designed to promote a close knit sense of community and neighborliness with an increased level of contact. Considerations involved in planning and zoning pocket neighborhoods include reducing or segregating parking and roadways, the use of shared communal areas that promote social activities, and homes with smaller square footage built in close proximity to one another (high density). Features in the smaller homes are designed to maximize space and can use built in shelves and porch areas, encouraging time spent outside with a focal point around a greenspace (instead of parking areas).

Environmental considerations often play a role in the planning of pocket neighborhoods, and those advocating them promote their design as an alternative to the sprawl, isolation, expense, and commuter and automobile focus of many larger homes in suburban developments.

== Origins ==
The term "pocket neighborhood" was coined by architect Ross Chapin. In 1995, Chapin partnered with The Cottage Company founder Jim Soules to build the first contemporary pocket neighborhood, the Third Street Cottages, in the city of Langley on Whidbey Island in Puget Sound. The Third Street Cottages, a collection of 8 modest 650–1,600-square-foot (60–149 m^{2}) cottages, was developed to take advantage of Langley's cottage ordinance, where zoning allowed for double density housing "if the homes were limited to 975 square feet".

Soules describes a pocket neighborhood as "a group of homes that face and relate to one another around a landscaped common area—the old bungalow court approach." Chapin also credits Radburn design housing, architect Bernard Maybeck's Rose Walk in the Berkeley Hills, and early 20th century cottage courts such as Seattle's Pine Street Cottages as influences on the pocket neighborhood plan. Pocket neighborhoods often adopt a model of cooperative ownership and shared community responsibilities similar to cohousing communities.

== Examples ==
Boston's pocket neighborhood of Audubon Circle added 20 sculpted bird silhouettes over one of the city's busiest intersections to "beautify and define" the area. A small neighborhood in Fife limited commercial development in a pocket neighborhood of 12 homes built in the 1930s. A grouping of three houses in Duluth, Minnesota, designed by architect David Salmela, adopts the "Scandinavian tradition of pocket neighborhoods" using common style and appearance for the homes and a central courtyard to enhance views and neighborly contact. A planned pocket neighborhood on 3.7 acres (15,000 m^{2}) in Beloit, Wisconsin was designed to include geothermal heating and cooling and is a sustainable development that will use a common road at the back of the homes, geothermal energy, and a community tea garden, while limiting the need to remove existing oak trees on the property.

Other projects include Conover Commons in Redmond, Washington, Greenwood Avenue Cottages in Shoreline, Washington, Danielson Grove in Kirkland, Washington, Umatilla Hill in Port Townsend, Washington and Salish Pond in Gresham, Oregon. The smaller homes are more affordable to maintain and keep up, and cooperation can be a benefit when it comes to watching children and pets.
