= Casupá =

- Town
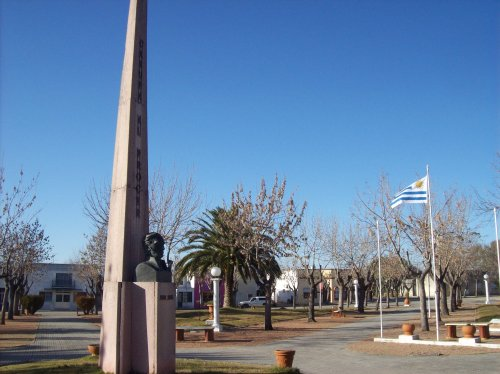
- The main square of Casupá

- Location in Uruguay
- Coordinates: 34°2′0″S 55°39′0″W
- Country: Uruguay
- Department: Florida Department
- Founded: 1908

Population (2011)
  - Total: 3,031
- Time zone: UTC -3
- Postal code: 94100
- Dial plan: +598 4311 (+4 digits)

Casupá is a town in the Florida Department of southern-central Uruguay.

== Geography ==
The town is located on Route 7, around 105 kilometres (65 mi) northeast of Montevideo.

== History ==
Casupá was founded on 15 September 1908, and on 12 June 1924, it was declared "Pueblo" (village) by the Act of Ley N° 7.728. It was then elevated to the category of "Villa" (town) on 5 July 1956 by the Act of Ley No. 12.297. Finally, on 16 November 2018, its status was elevated to "Ciudad" (city) by the Act of Ley N° 19.700.

== Population ==
In 2026, Casupá had a population of 3,031.

Year	Population
1963	2,044
1975	2,330
1985	2,351
1996	2,593
2004	2,668
2011	2,402
2026	3,031

Source: Instituto Nacional de Estadística de Uruguay

== Places of worship ==
- Parish Church of Mary Help of Christians (Roman Catholic)
