= Nuestra Señora de los Dolores, Reducto, Montevideo =

Roman Catholic parish church in Montevideo, Uruguay

Coordinates: 34°52′28.2″S 56°10′56″W

Nuestra Señora de los Dolores (Reducto)
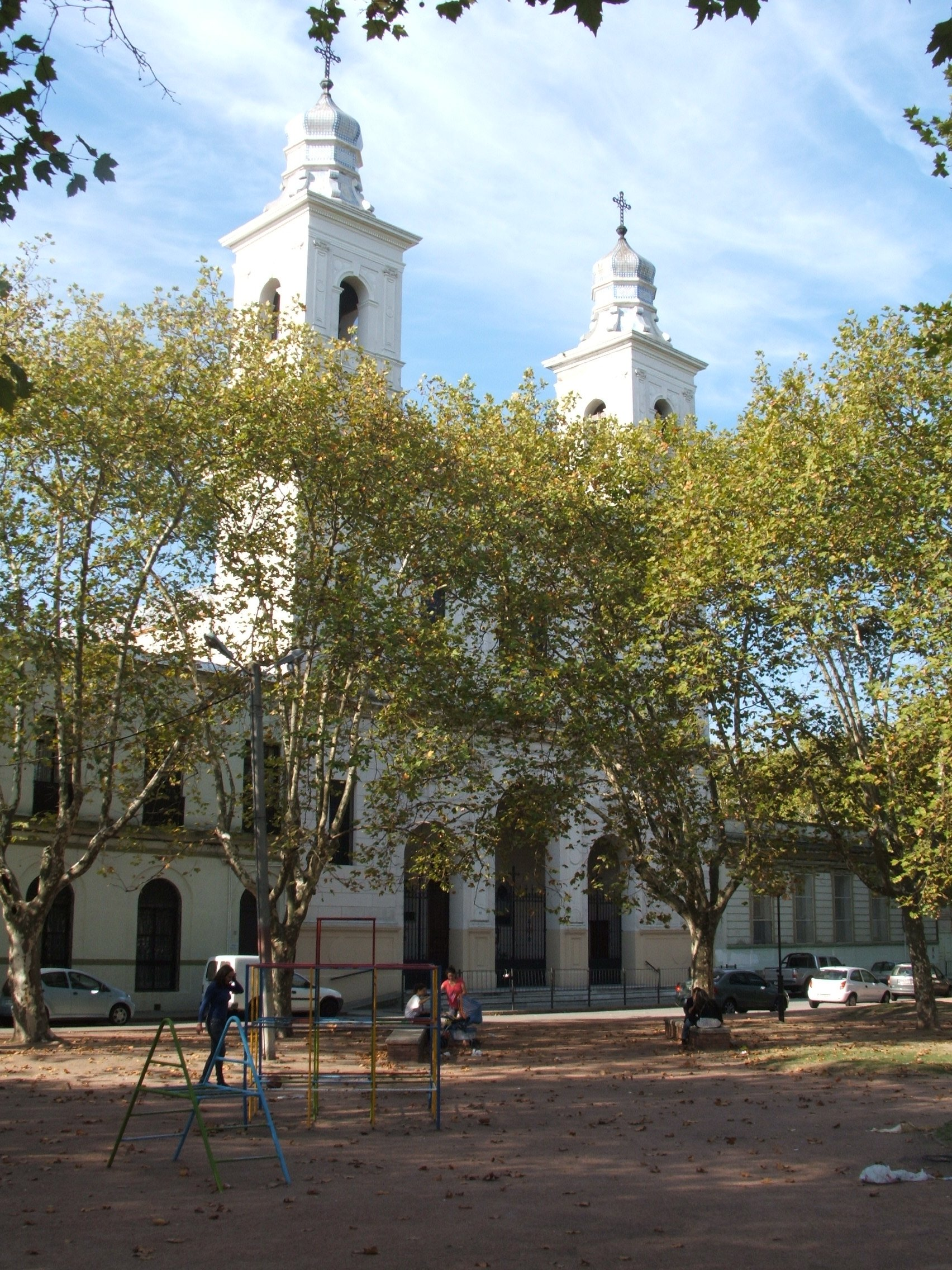

Religion
- Affiliation: Roman Catholic
- Ecclesiastical or organizational status: Parish church
- Year consecrated: 1875

Location
- Location: Av. Garibaldi 1667; Montevideo, Uruguay
- Interactive map of Nuestra Señora de los Dolores (Reducto)

Architecture
- Type: Church

The Church of Our Lady of Sorrows (Spanish: Iglesia de Nuestra Señora de los Dolores), popularly known as Iglesia del Reducto (in current times it belongs to the barrio La Figurita, but in the past it was part of Reducto), is a Roman Catholic parish church in Montevideo, Uruguay.

The parish was established on 20 November 1871.

The present temple was built in 1875 and completed in 1877 and is dedicated to Our Lady of Sorrows.

== Same devotion ==
There are other churches in Uruguay dedicated to the Virgin of Sorrows:

- Church of Our Lady of Sorrows, Larrañaga, Montevideo
- Church of Our Lady of Sorrows in Pan de Azúcar
- Church of Our Lady of Sorrows in Dolores
- Parish Church of Our Lady of Sorrows and St. Isidore the Laborer in Libertad
