= Vilardebó =

Vilardebó or Vilardebò may refer to:

People

- Josep Vilardebò i Picurena, Catalan chess player
- Justí Guitart i Vilardebò (1875–1940), Bishop of Urgell and Episcopal Co-Prince of Andorra
- Pedro Vilardebó (1953–2004), Spanish racing cyclist
- Roberto Arce Vilardebó (born 1964), Spanish journalist and television presenter
- Teodoro Vilardebó (1803–1857), Uruguayan physician

Places

- Hospital Vilardebó, a psychiatric hospital in Montevideo, Uruguay
