= Nuestra Señora de los Dolores (Tierra Santa), Montevideo =

Church building in Montevideo, Uruguay

Coordinates: 34°53′16.2″S 56°9′33.2″W

Nuestra Señora de los Dolores (Tierra Santa)
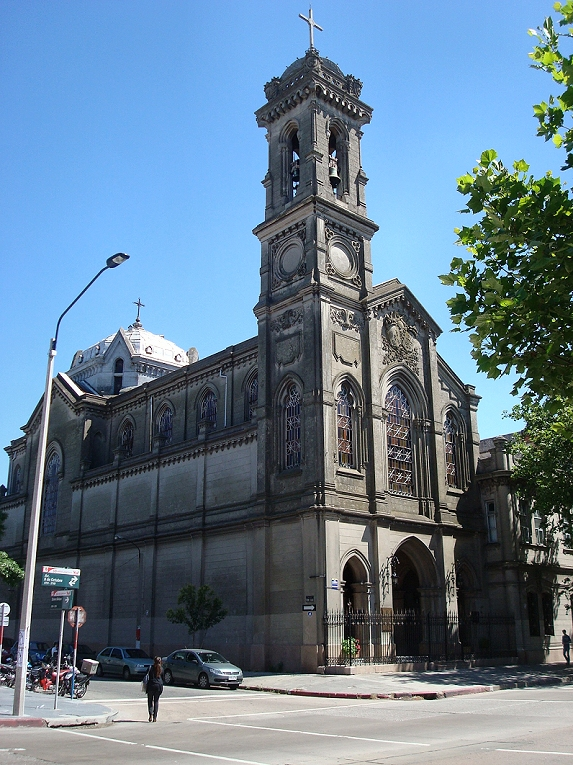

Religion
- Affiliation: Roman Catholic
- Ecclesiastical or organizational status: Parish church

Location
- Location: Av. 8 de Octubre 2757; Montevideo, Uruguay
- Interactive map of Nuestra Señora de los Dolores (Tierra Santa)

Architecture
- Type: Church
- Style: Eclecticism

The Church of Our Lady of Sorrows (Spanish: Iglesia de Nuestra Señora de los Dolores), popularly known as Tierra Santa, is a Roman Catholic parish church in Montevideo, Uruguay.

The temple is dedicated to Our Lady of Sorrows.

The parish was established on 30 October 1919. It is located in the barrio of Larrañaga, in an area which was part of La Blanqueada in the past.

The Montevideo Philharmonic Orchestra holds concerts here during its seasons.

== Same devotion ==
There are other churches in Uruguay dedicated to the Virgin of Sorrows:

- Church of Our Lady of Sorrows, also known as "Iglesia del Reducto", Montevideo
- Church of Our Lady of Sorrows in Pan de Azúcar
- Church of Our Lady of Sorrows in Dolores
- Parish Church of Our Lady of Sorrows and St. Isidore the Laborer in Libertad
