= Andrés Lamas =

Andrés Lamas may refer to:

- Andrés Lamas (writer), Uruguayan writer
- Andrés Lamas (footballer) (born 1984), Uruguayan footballer
