= Víctor López (footballer, born 1971) =

Uruguayan footballer

Personal information
- Full name: Víctor Manuel López Narge
- Date of birth: April 9, 1971 (age 55)
- Place of birth: Libertad, Uruguay
- Height: 1.74 m (5 ft 8 1/2 in)
- Position: Midfielder

Senior career*
| Years | Team | Apps | (Gls) |
| 1990–1993 | C.A. Peñarol | ? | (?) |
| 1994–1998 | Ferro Carril Oeste | 112 | (19) |
| 1998 | CF Extremadura | 0 | (0) |
| 1998–1999 | Independiente | 41 | (10) |
| 2000–2001 | Los Andes | 35 | (6) |
| 2001–2002 | Independiente | 10 | (0) |
| 2002 | Defensor | 20 | (0) |
| 2003 | Uralan Elista | 24 | (2) |
| 2004–2006 | Fenix | 19 | (1) |

International career
| 1991–1997 | Uruguay | 8 | (1) |
- * Club domestic league appearances and goals as of June 2007

Víctor Manuel López Narge (born April 9, 1971 in Libertad) is a retired football striker from Uruguay, who was nicknamed "Campanita" ("Little Bell" or "Tinker Bell") during his career. Having made his debut on May 5, 1991 against the United States (0-1), he obtained a total number of eight international cups for his national team, scoring one goal in a friendly match against Mexico on May 7, 1991.
