= Margarita (2024 TV series) =

- Genre: Fantasy; Romantic drama; Teen comedy
- Created by: Cris Morena
- Written by: Leandro Calderone
- Directed by: Mariano Ardañaz; Eduardo Ripari
- Starring: Mora Bianchi; Ramiro Spangenberg; Isabel Macedo; Graciela Stefani; Rafael Ferro; María Del Cerro; Julia Calvo; Lola abraldes; Tomás Benítez
- Countries of origin: Argentina; Uruguay
- Original language: Spanish
- No. of seasons: 3
- No. of episodes: 80

Production
- Production locations: Montevideo, Uruguay
- Production companies: Cris Morena Group; Cimarrón Cine

Original release
- Network: HBO Max
- Release: 2 September 2024 – 21 September 2026

Related
- Floricienta (2004–05)

Margarita is an Argentine-Uruguayan fantasy teen comedy-drama television series created by Cris Morena for HBO Max. It is a spin-off and sequel to Morena's Argentine telenovela Floricienta (2004–05). The series follows Floricienta's orphaned daughter as she participates in a talent competition organized by her aunt Delfina Santillán and begins to discover her own true story.

The 40-episode first season was released on Max on 2 September 2024. In February 2025, the series was renewed for a second season which premiered on 4 May 2026. The third and final season premiered on 24 August 2026.

== Series overview ==
The story of the series is set several years after the events of Floricienta, and revolves around Margarita (Mora Bianchi), the daughter of Florencia and Máximo, who is unaware of her true origins and has gone through several foster homes.

After stumbling upon a trendy arts center that offers a series of scholarships for talented young artists, Margarita decides to audition. The place is run by Delfina Santillán (Isabel Macedo), who after the encounter begins to suspect that the teenager could be the legitimate daughter of Florencia and Máximo, her sister and brother-in-law, and therefore the heir to the throne of the Kingdom of Krikoragán and all its fortune, which she stole.

From her discovery, Delfina realizes that the entire company she built based on lies, including the adoption of an orphan to pass her off as Florencia's daughter in order to appropriate the entire inheritance, is at risk of being destroyed after the appearance of Margarita, who is one of the true heir's to the entire estate.

== Cast and characters ==
=== Main ===
- Mora Bianchi as Margarita Ana Calderón de la Hoya
- Ramiro Spangenberg as Merlín Pietro
- Isabel Macedo as Delfina Santillán
- Graciela Stefani as María Laura "Malala" Torres-Oviedo
- Rafael Ferro as Severino
- María del Cerro as Yamila Puentes
- Julia Calvo as Ada
- Tomás Benítez as Pipe
- Mateo Belmonte as Rey
- Lola Abraldes as Daisy
- Joaquín Reficco as Zeki
- Pilar Masse as Única
- Pamela Baigún as Mei (season 1)
- Martiniano Rodríguez as Otto
- Antonella Podestá as Alaska
- José Barbeito as Romeo (season 1)
- Jose Fabini as Sasha
- Francisco Ruiz Barlett as Salo (season 1)
- Franco Yan as Federico Augusto Calderón de la Hoya (main seasons 2–3; recurring season 1)
- Valentino Petrilli as Jano (main seasons 2–3; recurring season 1)
- Benicio Gravier as Torino Ferrari/ Andres Florencio Calderón de la Hoya (main season 3; recurring season 2)

=== Recurring ===
- Julián Ache as Benedicto (season 1)
- Katerina Ikan as Petra (seasons 1–2)
- Trinidad Xanthopoulos as Julieta (season 1)
- Lisandro Guerra as Pez Eléctrico (season 1)
- Damasia Rawson as Cala
- Calu Fernández as Abril
- Martina Díaz as Camila Ferrande (seasons 1–2)
- Hervé Segata as Pierre (seasons 1–2)
- Paz Marini as Young Margarita (seasons 1–2)
- Nilo Pauls as Alí Pietro (seasons 1–2)
- Abril Schapo as Maika Kovácks (seasons 2–3)
- Miqueas Tabor as Borja Tabor (seasons 2–3)
- Felipe Bou Abdo as Rayan Kaur (seasons 2–3)
- Michelle Masson as Blue Minaj (seasons 2–3)
- Benjamín Alfonso as Polo Beltrán (seasons 2–3)

=== Notable guests ===
- Jorge Echagüe as Rey's father (season 1)
- Benjamín Rojas as Franco Fritzenwalden (seasons 1, 3)
- Joaquín Ochoa as Coach (season 1)
- Boy Olmi as President of Italy (season 1)
- Leo Trento as Hans Hoffmann (seasons 2–3)
- Virginia Delgado as Marquese Trinidad Terragón (seasons 2–3)
- Lali Espósito as Roberta Espinosa (season 2)
- Guido Carmona as Florencio Espinoza (seasons 2–3)
- Fabio Di Tomaso as Máximo Augusto Calderón de la Hoya (seasons 2–3)

== Episodes ==
Series	Episodes	Originally released	
Series	Episodes	First released	Last released
1	40	2 September 2024	21 October 2024
2	20	4 May 2026	25 May 2026
3	20	24 August 2026	21 September 2026

=== Season 1 (2024) ===
No. overall	No. in season	Title	Directed by	Written by	Original release date
1	1	"A Storybook Tale"	Mariano Ardañaz; Eduardo Ripari	Leandro Calderone	2 September 2024
In 2007, in Krikoragán, Florencia disappears, as does her daughter, Princess Margarita, after fleeing into exile. All contact with her and her siblings was lost after they were separated during their escape. Severino convinces Delfina to adopt an orphan girl to pass her off as the princess and raise her as the real one so that she can become the guardian of all the family's assets. Meanwhile, the real Margarita lives day to day trying to cope with poverty and the few resources she has. When Delfina announces that she will be offering scholarships to talented young artists, Margarita arrives at her doorstep.
2	2	"The Queen of Garbage"	Mariano Ardañaz; Eduardo Ripari	Leandro Calderone	2 September 2024
Margarita arrives at Delfina's house to take part in her scholarship program. At first, Delfina rejects her, but she asks her to get in line for the auditions. Margarita auditions under the name M and, in addition to revealing that she is an orphan, she tells a few white lies so that they don't realize she lives in extreme poverty. Daisy participates in the audition in disguise. Delfina realizes this and gets angry for exposing her face to the world, as she has been hiding her identity for years. Margarita wins over everyone present with her audition and is chosen as a finalist, but when Delfina asks her to sing a ballad, she cries, thanks her for participating, and sends her away.
3	3	"Sad Music Video"	Mariano Ardañaz; Eduardo Ripari	Leandro Calderone	2 September 2024
Delfina now knows that Margarita is indeed her niece and fears being caught by the law. Severino orders her to find Margarita because if she remains at large, it will be a problem; Delfina believes that Margarita knows her true identity. Gladys and Rinualdo desperately search for Margarita to lock her up again, but she hides at Delfina's house with Daisy's help. Margarita gets her a job in the kitchen with Ada while she lives in hiding at Delfina's house. Meanwhile, Merlín gets close to both Daisy and Margarita. Margarita is falling in love with Merlín, but Daisy tells her that she is attracted to him, so Margarita gives up and offers to help her. Delfina and Malala discuss everything that has happened, unaware that Margarita is listening to them while hiding in the closet.
4	4	"The Thistles"	Mariano Ardañaz; Eduardo Ripari	Leandro Calderone	2 September 2024
Delfina fails to discover Margarita hiding in her room. Daisy helps her escape without being seen. Delfina feels lonely, so she asks Severiano to rekindle their relationship because she misses him and they should enjoy life more. Malala confronts Margarita, demanding to know what she is doing at the Hangar Soho, and takes a selfie with her. As part of her plan, Malala pulls out a piece of Margarita's hair to do a DNA test. Malala sends the photo to Delfina and mocks her daughter. Merlín is about to kiss Margarita, but she rejects him, telling him she has a boyfriend and using Pipe to deceive him. Pipe feels used and gets upset. Daisy and Margarita talk about their past and how they miss their parents. Meanwhile, Delfina and Malala remember the bad things they did when they were younger. Severino tells Delfina that the DNA test was contaminated because it contained samples from Malala, but that there is a match.
5	5	"Romeo's Place"	Mariano Ardañaz; Eduardo Ripari	Leandro Calderone	2 September 2024
Delfina discovers through the cameras that Margarita is helping the scholars and sends for her. Merlín and Rey confront each other again, but Daisy defends Merlín. Romeo leaves the Hangar Soho because of all the bullying he suffers from his fellow scholars; they try to convince him to return, but he rejects them. Margarita manages to get into Romeo's house thanks to the gifts she sent him to talk to him and make him see the importance of continuing in the competition. The voting begins, and Rey and Merlín are tied with six votes each. Delfina asks for a revote, but then Romeo arrives to show his video, which shows how mean they were to him. Rey is determined to investigate Merlín because he is hiding something shady and does not appear in any of the Hangar Soho videos. Pipe tells Margarita that he is in love with her.
6	6	"Unique and Chosen"	Mariano Ardañaz; Eduardo Ripari	Leandro Calderone	9 September 2024
Margarita arranges for Pipe to work with Ada, but asks him never to repeat that it would be best to separate and explains that she loves him, but as a friend for life. Delfina announces to the scholars that Pez Eléctrico gave false information and must leave for lying about winning a poetry prize. So she asks the audience to vote on who should return to Hangar Soho. Pipe tells Margarita to seize the opportunity. To assuage her guilt over Pipe's feelings, Margarita attempts to set him up with Daisy. Daisy expresses her frustration to Margarita for attempting to unite them, as she has feelings for Merlín. She also questions her whether her action was because they are both in love with the same man. Delfina goes live to tell Margarita that she has been forgiven and is waiting for her. In the challenge, everyone fails and looks bad live. Margarita blames Única for sabotaging everyone and confronts her for hiding the truth about Camila, her sister. Única appears before everyone and wins the competition.
7	7	"Flíquiti"	Mariano Ardañaz; Eduardo Ripari	Leandro Calderone	9 September 2024
Delfina insists that Margarita's behavior is identical to her mother's and assures Severino that she is consumed with guilt knowing the conditions in which Margarita lives when she could be happy. Ada questions Margarita about where she got the word "flíquiti" because it is a made-up word and she wants to know if someone taught it to her. Delfina is about to reveal the whole truth to Daisy, but both Severino and Malala prevent her from speaking. Merlin looks for Margarita to say goodbye and reveals that he is from Krikoragán and that he is actually the prince who took the place of Daisy's parents. He explains that he approached Daisy to fix the situation because she is the one who should occupy that place. Margarita advises him not to hide and to reveal his story. Delfina finds Margarita at her house and is surprised when she says "flíquiti".
8	8	"Lie Truth"	Mariano Ardañaz; Eduardo Ripari	Leandro Calderone	9 September 2024
Delfina attacks Margarita and calls the police, but Ada defends her and Pipe. Delfina is shocked to learn how long Margarita has been hiding in her house and surprises her by allowing her to stay there with Pipe. Margarita tells Delfina and Severino that she was born in Argentina, that she never knew her parents, and that she has no identification. Delfina finds a photo of the woman who raised Margarita and discovers that she is indeed her niece, but to be sure, Severino and Delfina decide to give Margarita a polygraph test. Margarita discovers that Rey and Única are blackmailing Merlín and suggests that he stop them and tell the truth. Margarita and Merlín confess their love for each other and are about to kiss.
9	9	"Toxic Waste"	Mariano Ardañaz; Eduardo Ripari	Leandro Calderone	9 September 2024
Merlín and Margarita almost kiss, but Rey interrupts them and accuses Margarita of being a traitor and blackmails them by threatening to tell Daisy everything in exchange for Merlín producing his music video and Margarita starring in it. Margarita becomes a trending topic with her video. Severino assures Delfina that Margarita is planning something, so they will keep an eye on her. Delfina discovers that Única has taken down the company's social media account and confronts her. Margarita refuses to be blackmailed by Rey and decides not to continue filming his music video. Delfina receives an anonymous blackmail letter demanding money in exchange for keeping Margarita's secret. Merlín tells Margarita that the best thing to do is to marry Daisy to restore her power and do it in secret so that she can become queen.
10	10	"What We Want and What We Need"	Mariano Ardañaz; Eduardo Ripari	Leandro Calderone	9 September 2024
Delfina demands that Germán, her IT employee, investigate who is blackmailing her; she suspects everyone, especially Margarita, as she believes she knows the whole truth. Zeki has a crush on Pipe, Margarita realizes this and want to help them. Daisy spends more time with Merlín, which everyone notices, including Margarita, who admits to Pipe that she can't stand how close they are. Merlín's father asks his twin brother to keep an eye on his son, but he is caught and Merlín threatens him. Margarita asks Delfina for love advice; both feel comforted talking about the subject. Delfina confronts Malala because she believes she is blackmailing her, especially when she discovers that she has hidden cameras in her office to spy on her. Upon reviewing the cameras, Delfina and Malala discover that Germán is the one blackmailing her. Margarita, while out for a walk, catches Merlín kissing Daisy, leaving her heartbroken.
11	11	"Karaoke"	Mariano Ardañaz; Eduardo Ripari	Leandro Calderone	16 September 2024
Margarita remembers when she fell in love for the first time in New Delhi years ago. Merlín looks for Margarita to apologize because he knows she saw them, but Daisy overhears him and confronts him. Daisy finds out from a scholar that Margarita likes Merlín and that they both have feelings for each other. Delfina organizes a karaoke party that everyone participates in. Merlín tries to talk to Margarita, but she rejects him. Daisy and Margarita talk about Merlín, but Margarita assures her that there is nothing between them. Margarita and Daisy take the stage to sing karaoke together and thank Delfina for this opportunity. Daisy asks Merlin how he really feels about Margarita, and he assures her that he did like Margarita, but now he sees her as the woman of his life, even to the point of marrying her. Merlin sees his father and is shocked. Delfina receives another anonymous letter; the blackmailer, who is not Germán, assures her that she will soon know his identity and that with her payment, he knows that Daisy is not the real Margarita.
12	12	"Climate Change"	Mariano Ardañaz; Eduardo Ripari	Leandro Calderone	16 September 2024
Merlín's father kidnaps him and wants to take him back to Krikoragán. Delfina is harassed by the hacker. Daisy tells everyone about her past and her origins, but Margarita begins to have flashbacks from her childhood, suspecting the truth. Everyone discovers that Merlín has blocked them. While he begs for his freedom, Merlín's father assures him that he will keep him locked up until he gets married. Daisy and Margarita suspect Merlín's departure; Ada tells her that there was something strange about him and that all the information he gave is false. Otto discovers Mei's medical condition. Única remembers the day she ran over her sister; she claims she didn't see her, but is determined to face justice. In a live broadcast, Delfina shares how she found Daisy and says that she is actually the impostor. Severino asks to cut the live broadcast because he fears she will say too much. Merlín manages to talk to Margarita, but she despises him for running away.
13	13	"Traffic Light"	Mariano Ardañaz; Eduardo Ripari	Leandro Calderone	16 September 2024
Then, as Delfina zeros in on her hacker, Margarita confronts Única and makes a surprising discovery back at the Hangar.
14	14	"Slumber Party"	Mariano Ardañaz; Eduardo Ripari	Leandro Calderone	16 September 2024
Delfina and Salo organize a pajama party where Única and Rey connect.
15	15	"An Unexpected Turn"	Mariano Ardañaz; Eduardo Ripari	Leandro Calderone	16 September 2024
16	16	"Someone Is in Trouble (Part 1)"	Mariano Ardañaz; Eduardo Ripari	Leandro Calderone	23 September 2024
17	17	"Someone Is in Trouble (Part 2)"	Mariano Ardañaz; Eduardo Ripari	Leandro Calderone	23 September 2024
18	18	"Political Asylum"	Mariano Ardañaz; Eduardo Ripari	Leandro Calderone	23 September 2024
19	19	"Private Lives"	Mariano Ardañaz; Eduardo Ripari	Leandro Calderone	23 September 2024
20	20	"Another Princess in the Palace"	Mariano Ardañaz; Eduardo Ripari	Leandro Calderone	23 September 2024
21	21	"Little Weed"	Mariano Ardañaz; Eduardo Ripari	Leandro Calderone	30 September 2024
22	22	"Hunches"	Mariano Ardañaz; Eduardo Ripari	Leandro Calderone	30 September 2024
23	23	"Fiction or Reality"	Mariano Ardañaz; Eduardo Ripari	Leandro Calderone	30 September 2024
24	24	"Canceled"	Mariano Ardañaz; Eduardo Ripari	Leandro Calderone	30 September 2024
25	25	"The Cards of Destiny"	Mariano Ardañaz; Eduardo Ripari	Leandro Calderone	30 September 2024
26	26	"Fairy in Love"	Mariano Ardañaz; Eduardo Ripari	Leandro Calderone	7 October 2024
27	27	"Crossroads"	Mariano Ardañaz; Eduardo Ripari	Leandro Calderone	7 October 2024
28	28	"Another Stone in the Path"	Mariano Ardañaz; Eduardo Ripari	Leandro Calderone	7 October 2024
29	29	"As the Saying Goes"	Mariano Ardañaz; Eduardo Ripari	Leandro Calderone	7 October 2024
30	30	"Faces and Masks"	Mariano Ardañaz; Eduardo Ripari	Leandro Calderone	7 October 2024
31	31	"On Time"	Mariano Ardañaz; Eduardo Ripari	Leandro Calderone	14 October 2024
32	32	"DNA or ID"	Mariano Ardañaz; Eduardo Ripari	Leandro Calderone	14 October 2024
33	33	"The Heirs"	Mariano Ardañaz; Eduardo Ripari	Leandro Calderone	14 October 2024
34	34	"The Princess Who Lives in the Heart of the People (Part 1)"	Mariano Ardañaz; Eduardo Ripari	Leandro Calderone	14 October 2024
35	35	"The Princess Who Lives in the Heart of the People (Part 2)"	Mariano Ardañaz; Eduardo Ripari	Leandro Calderone	14 October 2024
36	36	"Under the Marquis' Cape"	Mariano Ardañaz; Eduardo Ripari	Leandro Calderone	21 October 2024
37	37	"The Great Answer"	Mariano Ardañaz; Eduardo Ripari	Leandro Calderone	21 October 2024
38	38	"Without Words"	Mariano Ardañaz; Eduardo Ripari	Leandro Calderone	21 October 2024
39	39	"To Win or To Lose"	Mariano Ardañaz; Eduardo Ripari	Leandro Calderone	21 October 2024
40	40	"Last Chapter"	Mariano Ardañaz; Eduardo Ripari	Leandro Calderone	21 October 2024

=== Season 2 (2026) ===
No. overall	No. in season	Title	Directed by	Written by	Original release date
41	1	"I Say Magic (Part 1)"	Mariano Ardañaz & Eduardo Ripari	Leandro Calderone	4 May 2026
While Delfina expands her influence by launching her new streaming platform Reina, Margarita and Fach arrive in Krikoragán just as a Merlin's royal wedding is about to take place.
42	2	"I Say Magic (Part 2)"	Mariano Ardañaz & Eduardo Ripari	Leandro Calderone	4 May 2026
After fleeing his own wedding, Merlín reunites with Margarita to escape Krikoragán. Meanwhile, Fach and the League continue their search for the third heir, and Delfina enhances her digital empire by introducing an AI-generated Margarita.
43	3	"I Will Escape"	Mariano Ardañaz & Eduardo Ripari	Leandro Calderone	4 May 2026
Delfina's digital moves cause widespread chaos. Ada's attempt to rescue Pipe results in both being captured, while Margarita and Merlín manage to escape with the help of rebels as Fach gets closer to finding the prince.
44	4	"Oh La La"	Mariano Ardañaz & Eduardo Ripari	Leandro Calderone	4 May 2026
Delfina deals with complications involving Daisy. Meanwhile, Fach moves closer to a critical lead regarding the heirs, and Margarita continues to navigate her new reality as a fugitive.
45	5	"Nothing But Fiction"	Mariano Ardañaz & Eduardo Ripari	Leandro Calderone	4 May 2026
An accidental livestream raises Delfina's suspicions about Margarita's true status. While Fach successfully escapes Krikoragán to reunite with her, Yamila reveals the truth behind Delfina's AI-generated creation.
46	6	"Musical Fantasy"	Mariano Ardañaz & Eduardo Ripari	Leandro Calderone	11 May 2026
Tensions brew among Margarita and her friends now that they are back, while Delfina tightens her control over the AI-Margarita.
47	7	"Our Essence"	Mariano Ardañaz & Eduardo Ripari	Leandro Calderone	11 May 2026
After revealing the truth to her friends, Margarita and her friends launch the Flikiti streaming channel to fight back.
48	8	"And Who Are You?"	Mariano Ardañaz & Eduardo Ripari	Leandro Calderone	11 May 2026
As their streaming channel Flikiti rapidly grows in popularity, Delfina resorts to extreme measures to maintain her dominance.
49	9	"Anything Could Happen"	Mariano Ardañaz & Eduardo Ripari	Leandro Calderone	11 May 2026
Margarita and Fach make a daring escape from Reina Studios while the League coordinates a rescue.
50	10	"Points of View"	Mariano Ardañaz & Eduardo Ripari	Leandro Calderone	11 May 2026
The League's rescue mission exposes the regime, leaving Delfina struggling to handle Flikiti's massive rise.
51	11	"Upside Down World"	Mariano Ardañaz & Eduardo Ripari	Leandro Calderone	18 May 2026
Following Daisy's promotion to princess, Erasmus threatens exposure while Merlín makes a risky move.
52	12	"The Cost of the Truth"	Mariano Ardañaz & Eduardo Ripari	Leandro Calderone	18 May 2026
Delfina scrambles to maintain control after Erasmus exposes Daisy's true identity.
53	13	"Familiar"	Mariano Ardañaz & Eduardo Ripari	Leandro Calderone	18 May 2026
Under immense pressure to reveal her true identity, Margarita prioritizes putting Daisy first.
54	14	"Viral"	Mariano Ardañaz & Eduardo Ripari	Leandro Calderone	18 May 2026
The group relocates after Delfina discovers their hideout, while Malala's viral exposé fuels the public scandal.
55	15	"Take a Chance"	Mariano Ardañaz & Eduardo Ripari	Leandro Calderone	18 May 2026
Delfina claims victory using tampered DNA results, but a determined Margarita gears up for a public confrontation.
56	16	"Intuition's Plans"	Mariano Ardañaz & Eduardo Ripari	Leandro Calderone	25 May 2026
Margarita storms Reina while Fach seeks proof about his brother. Meanwhile, the group plans to expose Delfina, who retaliates with a personal low blow.
57	17	"He Who Laughs Last"	Mariano Ardañaz & Eduardo Ripari	Leandro Calderone	25 May 2026
From their hideout, Margarita and her friends regroup to defeat Delfina. News of Pío Pietro shakes the balance of power, while Fach pursues a DNA test for Florencio.
58	18	"The Mysterious Woman"	Mariano Ardañaz & Eduardo Ripari	Leandro Calderone	25 May 2026
Amid confusion surrounding Andrés, the Delfina and her adversaries trade tactical attacks. Later, Fach challenges Rey's intentions.
59	19	"King of Everything"	Mariano Ardañaz & Eduardo Ripari	Leandro Calderone	25 May 2026
Margarita and her friends uncover a secret about Rey's alleged authority. As Margarita struggles with her growing distrust, Delfina attempts to institutionalize Ada to keep her quiet.
60	20	"Who Tells the Story"	Mariano Ardañaz & Eduardo Ripari	Leandro Calderone	25 May 2026
After the exposure plan falls through, Delfina manipulates the narrative to shift the blame to Severino. Margarita chooses to trust Rey, while Daisy rejects the truth. At the end, Margarita and Fach are recognized as the true heirs to the throne by the Marquese, and it is revealed that Torino might actually be Andrés and that Máximo is alive and imprisoned in Krikoragán.

=== Season 3 (2026) ===
No. overall	No. in season	Title	Directed by	Written by	Original release date
61	1	"Stupid"	Mariano Ardañaz; Eduardo Ripari	Leandro Calderone	24 August 2026
62	2	"The Invisible"	Mariano Ardañaz; Eduardo Ripari	Leandro Calderone	24 August 2026
63	3	"Why"	Mariano Ardañaz; Eduardo Ripari	Leandro Calderone	24 August 2026
64	4	"Rebels"	Mariano Ardañaz; Eduardo Ripari	Leandro Calderone	24 August 2026
65	5	"How a Villain Is Born"	Mariano Ardañaz; Eduardo Ripari	Leandro Calderone	24 August 2026
66	6	"To Be or To Seem"	Mariano Ardañaz; Eduardo Ripari	Leandro Calderone	31 August 2026
67	7	"In the Wolf's Mouth"	Mariano Ardañaz; Eduardo Ripari	Leandro Calderone	31 August 2026
68	8	"Your Story"	Mariano Ardañaz; Eduardo Ripari	Leandro Calderone	31 August 2026
69	9	"Like Strangers"	Mariano Ardañaz; Eduardo Ripari	Leandro Calderone	31 August 2026
70	10	"A Place on the Throne"	Mariano Ardañaz; Eduardo Ripari	Leandro Calderone	31 August 2026
71	11	"The Big Winner"	Mariano Ardañaz; Eduardo Ripari	Leandro Calderone	7 September 2026
72	12	"Happy Music Video"	Mariano Ardañaz; Eduardo Ripari	Leandro Calderone	7 September 2026
73	13	"The Art of Negotiation"	Mariano Ardañaz; Eduardo Ripari	Leandro Calderone	7 September 2026
74	14	"That's Who I Am"	Mariano Ardañaz; Eduardo Ripari	Leandro Calderone	7 September 2026
75	15	"A History Lesson"	Mariano Ardañaz; Eduardo Ripari	Leandro Calderone	7 September 2026
76	16	"Weaving Fairy"	Mariano Ardañaz; Eduardo Ripari	Leandro Calderone	14 September 2026
76	16	"The Queen of the Rebel Flíkiti"	Mariano Ardañaz; Eduardo Ripari	Leandro Calderone	14 September 2026
76	16	"The Seeds"	Mariano Ardañaz; Eduardo Ripari	Leandro Calderone	14 September 2026
76	16	"Nursery"	Mariano Ardañaz; Eduardo Ripari	Leandro Calderone	14 September 2026
80	20	"Make Your Story Count"	Mariano Ardañaz; Eduardo Ripari	Leandro Calderone	21 September 2026

== Background and production ==
=== Development ===
In June 2022, it was reported that Cris Morena had begun developing a series in co-production with WarnerMedia Latin America for HBO Max with Leandro Calderone as the screenwriter. Almost a year later, in April 2023, it was confirmed that the title of the series would be Margarita and that it would be a spin-off of the telenovela Floricienta that ran successfully between 2004 and 2005, and that it was broadcast and adapted in several countries.

In late February 2025, it was announced that the series had been renewed for a second season. In September 2025, the series was renewed for a third season.

=== Casting ===
The first confirmed cast member for the series was Isabel Macedo, who reprised her role as villain Delfina Santillán. In August 2022, Tomás Benítez, a student at Otro Mundo –an artistic training school founded by Cris Morena– was cast. In April 2023, Graciela Stefani, María del Cerro, Martín Seefeld and Julia Calvo were cast. Stefani reprised her well-known role as Malala. In June, Mora Biachi, also a student at Otro Mundo, was announced as the protagonist of the series, in the role of Margarita.

In October 2023, it was announced that Benjamín Rojas would make a special appearance in the series, reprising his role as Franco Fritzenwalden. In November, once filming was completed, Ramiro Spangenberg was confirmed as the male lead, while the rest of the young cast was confirmed in December, consisting of Mateo Belmonte, Lola Abraldes, Joaquín Reffico, Pilar Masse, Pamela Baigún, Martiniano Rodríguez, Antonella Podestá and José Barbeito, all of whom were students at Otro Mundo.

=== Filming ===
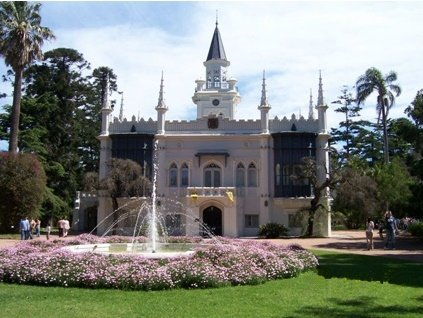
Quinta Aurelio Berro

Filming of the series began on 24 July 2023, and took place entirely in Montevideo, Uruguay. It was a co-production between Cris Morena Group and the Uruguayan company Cimarrón Cine. Some Montevideo landmarks and well-known establishments were filmed for the series, such as the Hotel Carrasco, the Rambla, the Aurelio Berro Mansion, Reus al Norte and Central Montevideo. The second and third seasons were filmed back-to-back from 12 May to 26 September 2025.

== Release ==
In March 2024, Cris Morena and Max published the first trailer for the series, revealing that it would premiere that year. In August it was revealed that the 40-episode series would premiere on 2 September 2024 and that only five episodes would be released per week. In addition, it was confirmed that the television station Telefe had partnered with Max to also broadcast the series.

== Discography ==
=== Albums ===
- Margarita, que tu cuento valga la pena (2024)
- Margarita, que tu cuento valga la pena 2 (2026)

=== Live albums ===
- Margarita (En Vivo 2025) (2025)

=== EPs ===
- Margarita (Acusticos) (2025)

== Accolades ==
Year	Award	Category	Recipient(s)	Result	Ref.
2024	Martín Fierro Fashion Awards	Actress With the Best Style in Fiction	Isabel Macedo	Won	
2024	Martín Fierro Fashion Awards	Actor With the Best Style in Fiction	Boy Olmi	Nominated	
2025	Premios Gardel	Best New Artist	Margarita	Nominated	
2025	Premios Gardel	Best Children's Music Album	Margarita, que tu cuento valga la pena	Won	
2025	Premios Gardel	Best Soundtrack Album	Margarita, que tu cuento valga la pena	Nominated	
2025	Martín Fierro Awards	Best Daily Fiction	Margarita	Won	
2025	Martín Fierro Awards	Best Writer/Screenwriter	Leandro Calderone and Cris Morena	Nominated	
2025	Martín Fierro Awards	Best Director – Fiction	Mariano Ardanaz and Eduardo Ripari	Nominated	
2025	Martín Fierro Awards	Best Lead Actress in a Drama Series	Isabel Macedo	Won	
2025	Martín Fierro Awards	Breakout Artist	Lola Abraldes	Won	
2025	Martín Fierro Awards	Breakout Artist	Mora Bianchi	Nominated	
2025	Martín Fierro Awards	Breakout Artist	Ramiro Spangenberg	Nominated	
2025	Martín Fierro Awards	Best Supporting Actress	Julia Calvo	Won	
2025	Martín Fierro Awards	Best Supporting Actor	Rafael Ferro	Nominated	
