= Villa Muñoz =

Villa Muñoz - Retiro
- Barrio
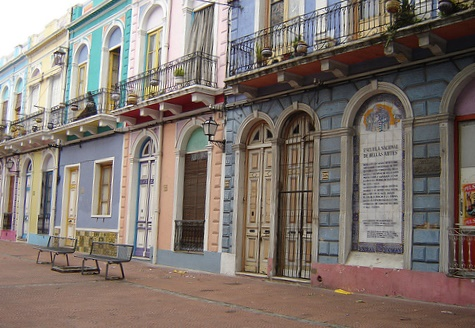
- Emilio Reus Str. in Reus al Norte

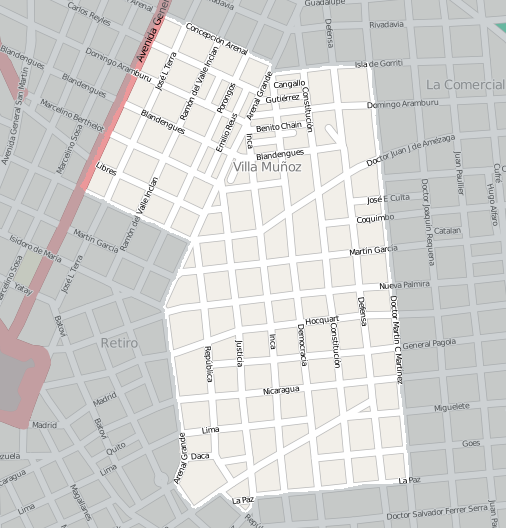
- Street map of Villa Muñoz

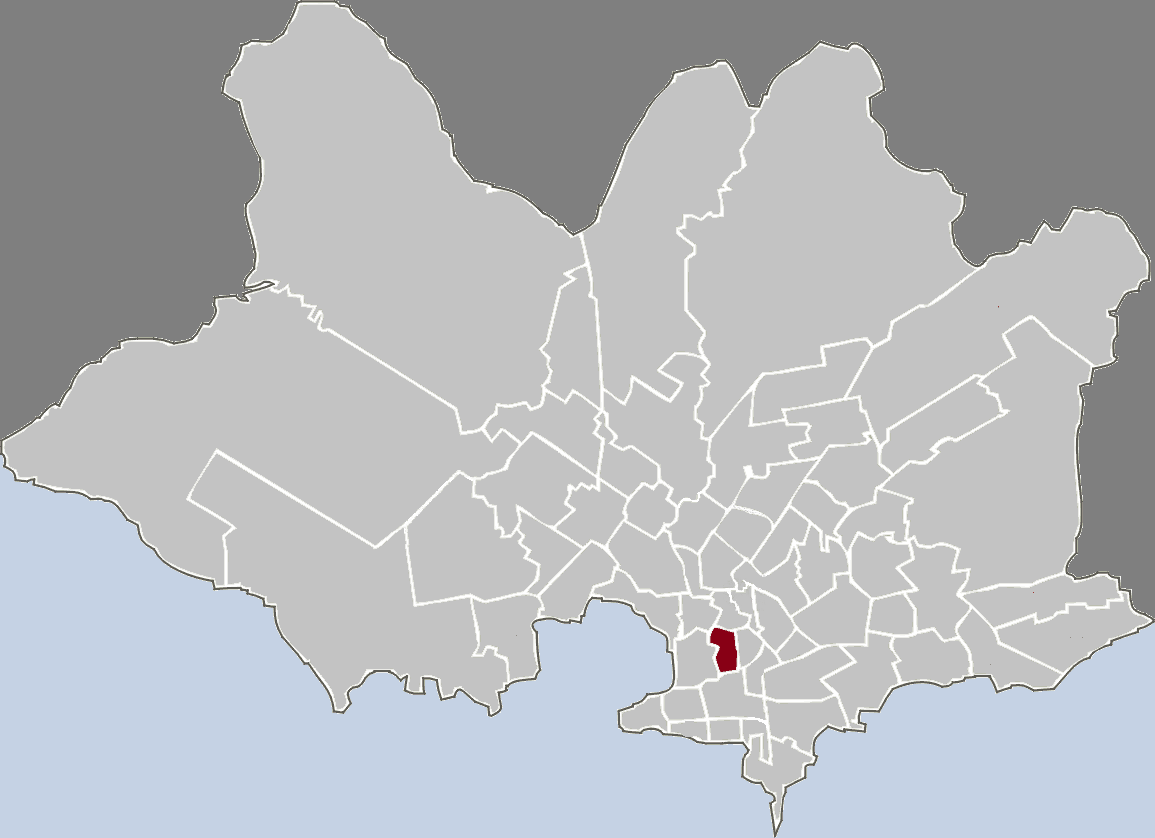
- Location of Villa Muñoz in Montevideo
- Coordinates: 34°53′16″S 56°10′37″W
- Country: Uruguay
- Department: Montevideo Department
- City: Montevideo

Villa Muñoz - Retiro is a barrio (neighbourhood or district) of Montevideo, Uruguay, bordering Aguada and Reducto to the west, La Figurita to the north, La Comercial to the east and Cordón to the south.

The neighborhood originated at the end of the 19th century, and was populated by European immigrants throughout the first half of the 20th century, especially by Ashkenazi Jews, which led to it being known as the Jewish quarter of Montevideo. It is an important commercial shopping district, due to the existence of a large number of Jewish-owned wholesale stores.

== History ==
Villa Muñoz in 1907

The origin of the neighborhood dates back to the late 1880s during the urban expansion of Montevideo, when the Spanish businessman Emilio Reus began to build the residential area that bears his name, Reus al Norte. For its construction, more than 2,000 workers were employed, and two tram lines were brought to the area. The works proceeded slowly, and in 1989 the director of the construction company sought credit and began selling the houses that were not yet finished.

Francisco Piria auctioned off the first lots, and the first to make a purchase was President Máximo Tajes himself. However, due to the baring crisis, the company went bankrupt and became part of the capital of the newly created Banco Hipotecario, which finished the works and finally sold the homes. In addition, the name of the neighborhood was changed to Villa Muñoz, in honor of the first president of the bank.

During the first half of the 20th century, Ashkenazi Jews, fleeing pogroms in Russia and Eastern Europe, settled in Villa Muñoz, establishing Jewish schools and synagogues. For this reason the neighborhood began to be known as the Barrio de los Judíos (Spanish for 'Jewish Quarter').

The former prison for women of Miguelete Street (closed since 1986), the Estrella del Norte, located in the southwestern edge of the barrio, had its west wing restored and transformed into a contemporary art exhibition area, the Espacio de Arte Contemporáneo, which opened to the public in June 2010.

== Places of worship ==
- Parish Church of the Immaculate Heart of Mary, Inca 2040; popularly known as St. Pancras, a popular pilgrimage destination every 12th day of the month (Roman Catholic, Claretians)
- Parish Church of Our Lady of Mercy and St. Jude Taddhaeus, a sanctuary; Juan José de Amézaga 2018 (Roman Catholic)

== See also ==
- History of the Jews in Uruguay
