= Nuestra Señora de la Merced y San Judas Tadeo, Montevideo =

Church in Montevideo, Uruguay

Coordinates: 34°53′7.4″S 56°10′27.8″W

Nuestra Señora de la Merced y San Judas Tadeo
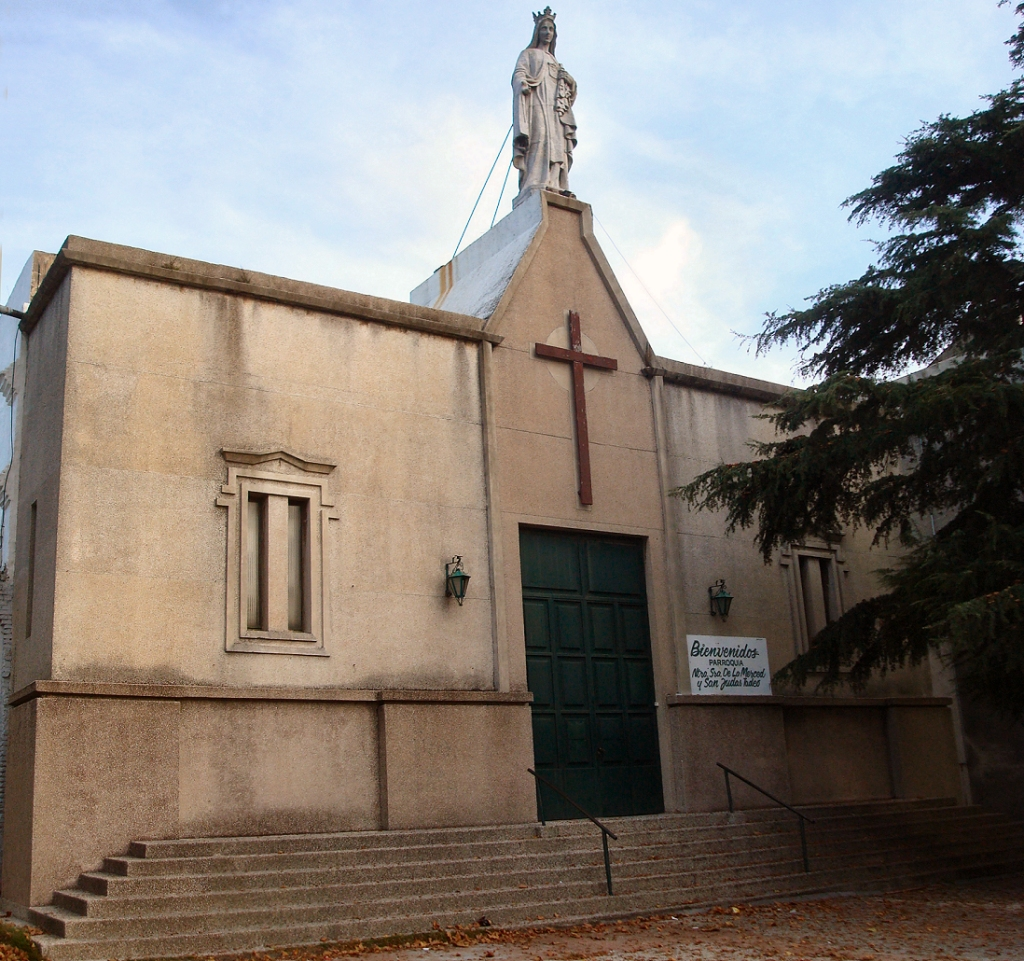

Religion
- Affiliation: Roman Catholic
- Ecclesiastical or organisational status: Parish church
- Year consecrated: 1927

Location
- Location: Juan José de Amézaga 2018; Montevideo, Uruguay
- Interactive map of Nuestra Señora de la Merced y San Judas Tadeo

Architecture
- Type: Church

The Church of Our Lady of Mercy and St. Jude Taddhaeus (Spanish: Iglesia de Nuestra Señora de la Merced y san Judas Tadeo), popularly known as La Merced, is a Roman Catholic parish church in Villa Muñoz, Montevideo, Uruguay.

The temple dates back to 1907; the crypt was consecrated on 8 September 1927. Originally held by the Mercedarians, now it belongs to the Metropolitan Curia. It is dedicated to Our Lady of Mercy and to the apostle Saint Jude Taddhaeus. The church was declared a sanctuary.

The parish was established on 30 January 1936.
