= La Figurita =

- Barrio
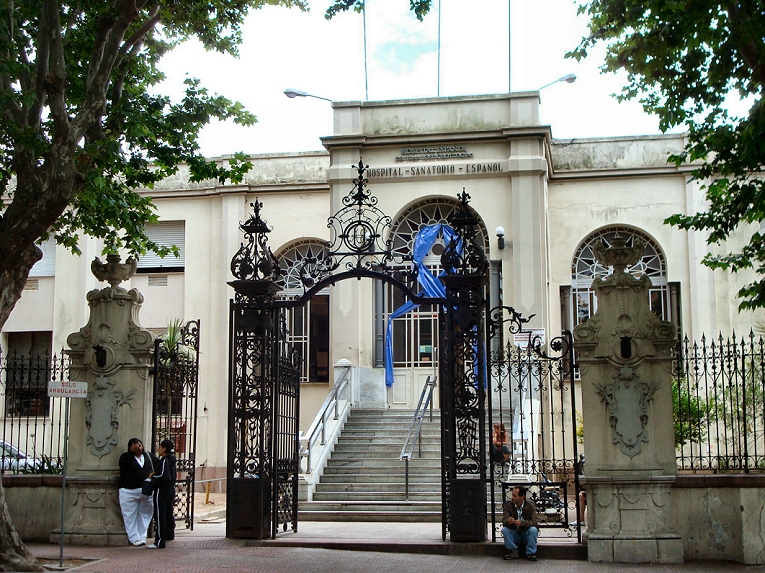
- Spanish Hospital in La Figurita

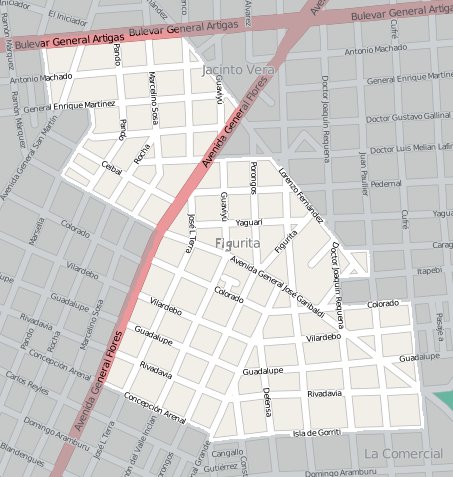
- Street map of La Figurita

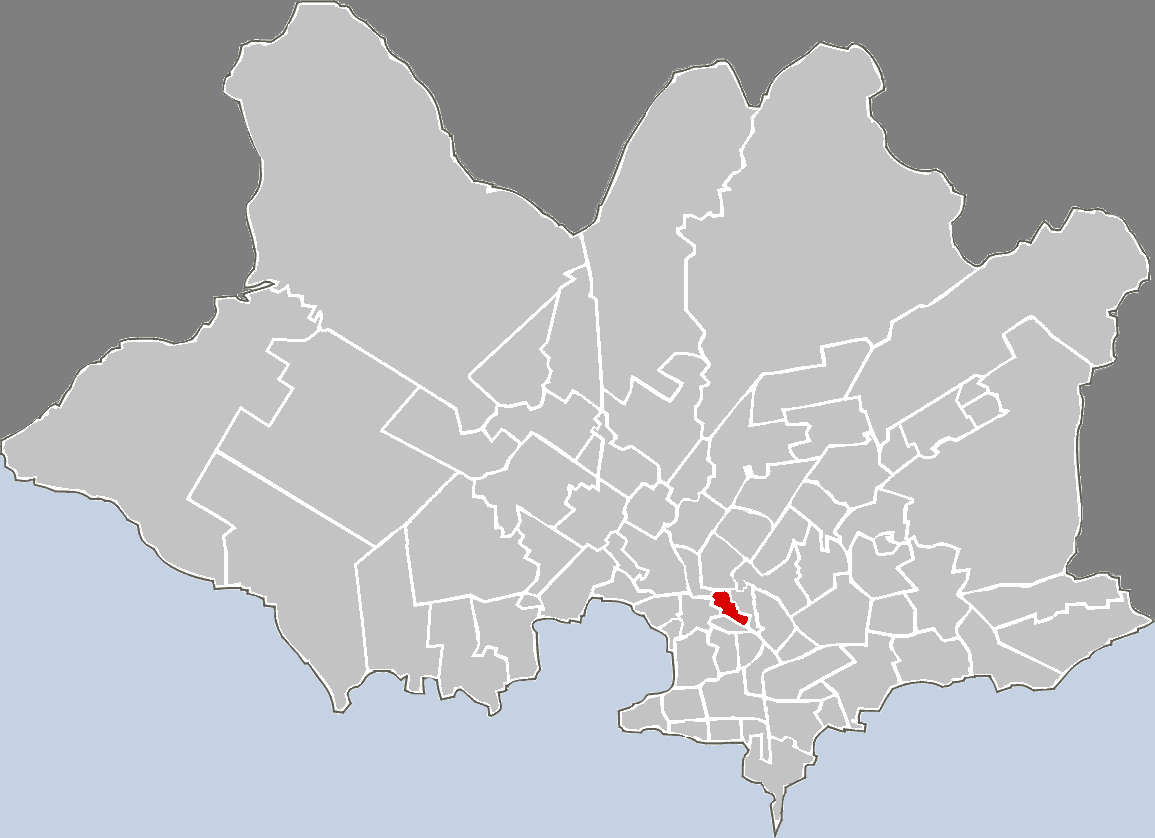
- Location of La Figurita in Montevideo
- Coordinates: 34°52′49″S 56°10′39″W
- Country: Uruguay
- Department: Montevideo Department
- City: Montevideo

La Figurita is a barrio (neighbourhood or district) of Montevideo, Uruguay. It is home to the Hospital Español.

== Location ==
It borders Reducto and Atahualpa to the west, Brazo Oriental to the north, Jacinto Vera to the east, La Comercial and Villa Muñoz to the south.

== Places of worship ==
- Parish Church of Our Lady of Sorrows, popularly known as "Iglesia del Reducto" Garibaldi 1667 (Roman Catholic)
- Parish Church of St Michael Archangel, Concepción Arenal 1893 (Roman Catholic)
- Church of the Resurrection, Ramón del Valle Inclán 2261 esq. Colorado (Russian Orthodox)

== See also ==
- Barrios of Montevideo
