= Jacinto Vera, Montevideo =

Jacinto Vera
- Barrio
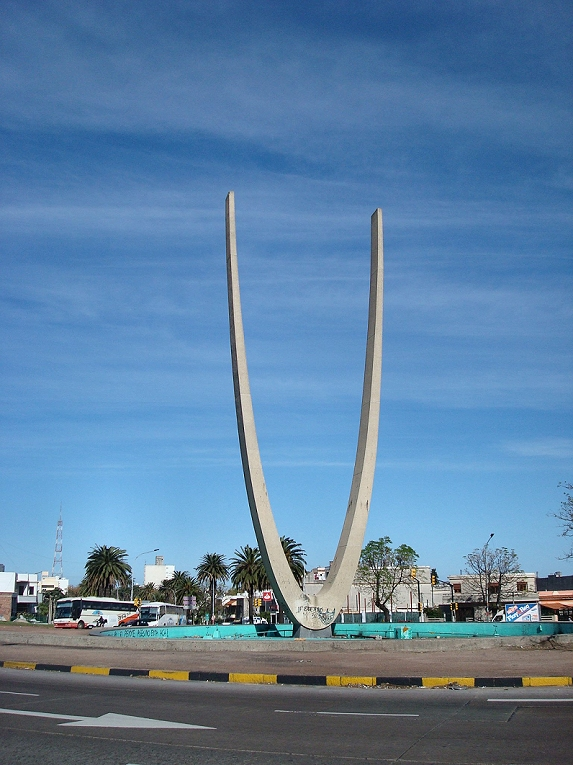
- Monument to Luis Batlle Berres

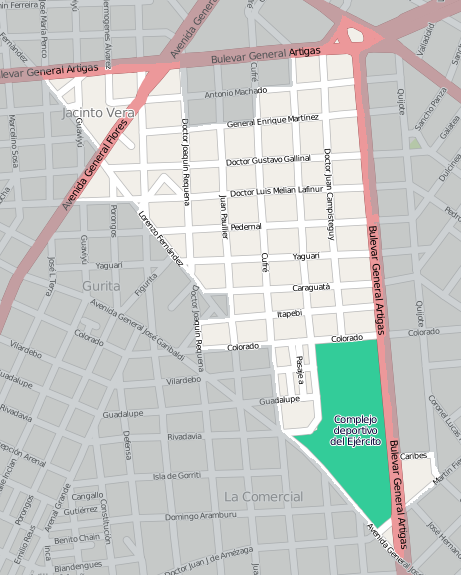
- Street map of Jacinto Vera

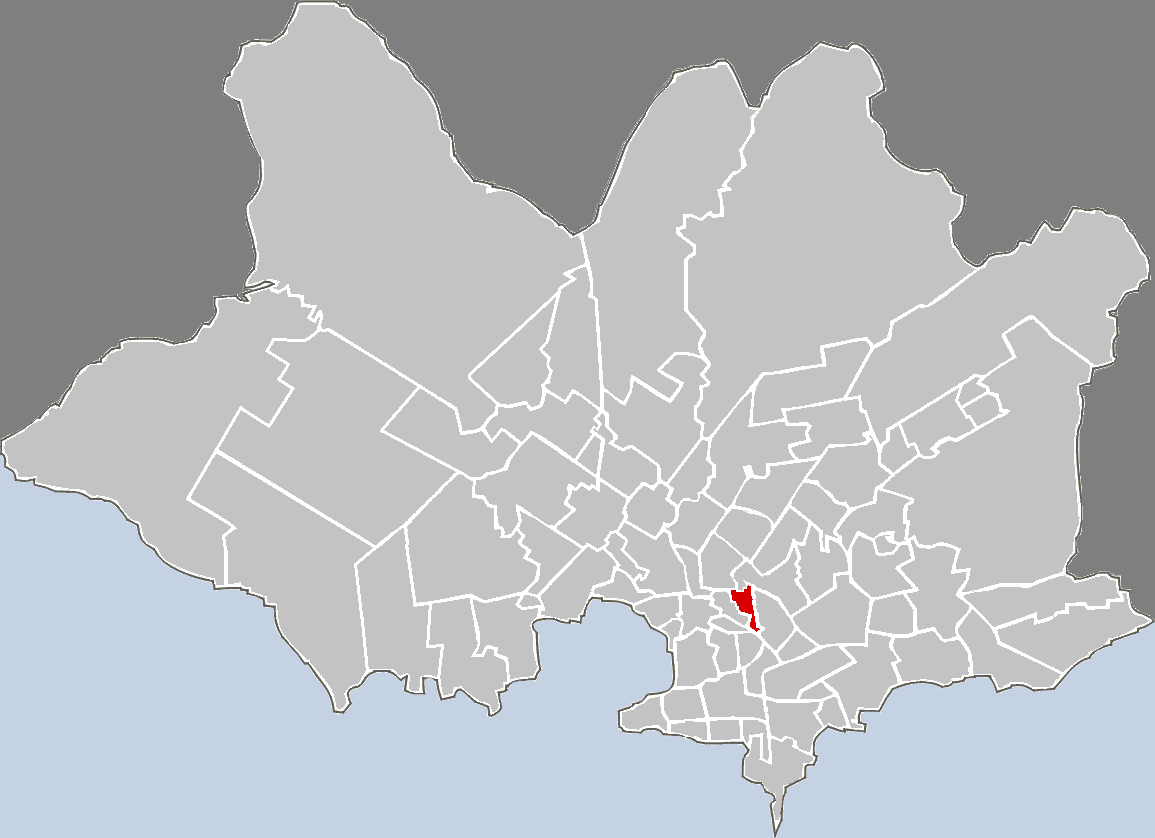
- Location of Jacinto Vera in Montevideo
- Coordinates: 34°52′32″S 56°10′13″W
- Country: Uruguay
- Department: Montevideo Department
- City: Montevideo

Jacinto Vera is a barrio (neighbourhood or district) of Montevideo, Uruguay, named after Jacinto Vera (1813 - 1881), the first Catholic bishop of Montevideo. It is home to the ex-Military School, now the Army Command.

== Location ==
Jacinto Vera shares borders with La Figurita to the west, Brazo Oriental and Bolívar to the north, Larrañaga to the east and La Comercial to the south. At the northeast edge of the barrio is the square around which Artigas Boulevard "folds" 90 degrees and on which is the famous Monument to Luis Batlle Berres.

== Places of worship ==
- Saint Antoninus Church, Caraguatay 2086 (Roman Catholic, Dehonians)

== See also ==
- Barrios of Montevideo

== Gallery ==
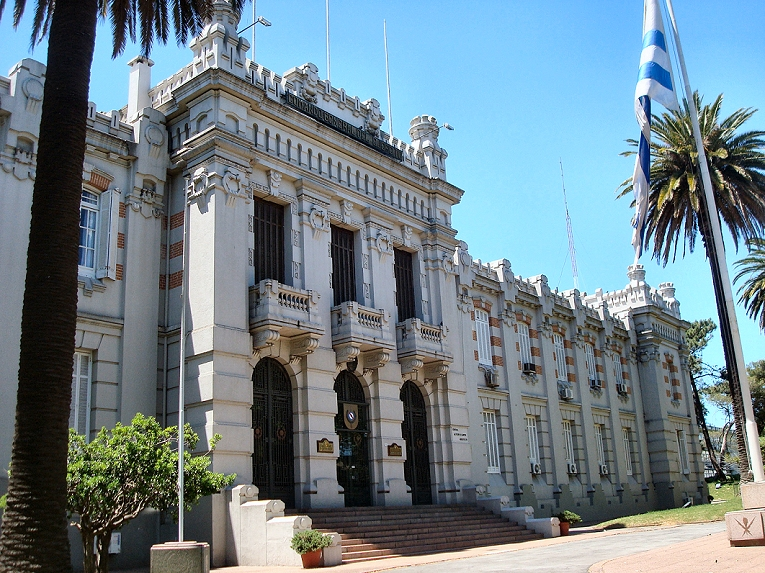
Comando del Ejército

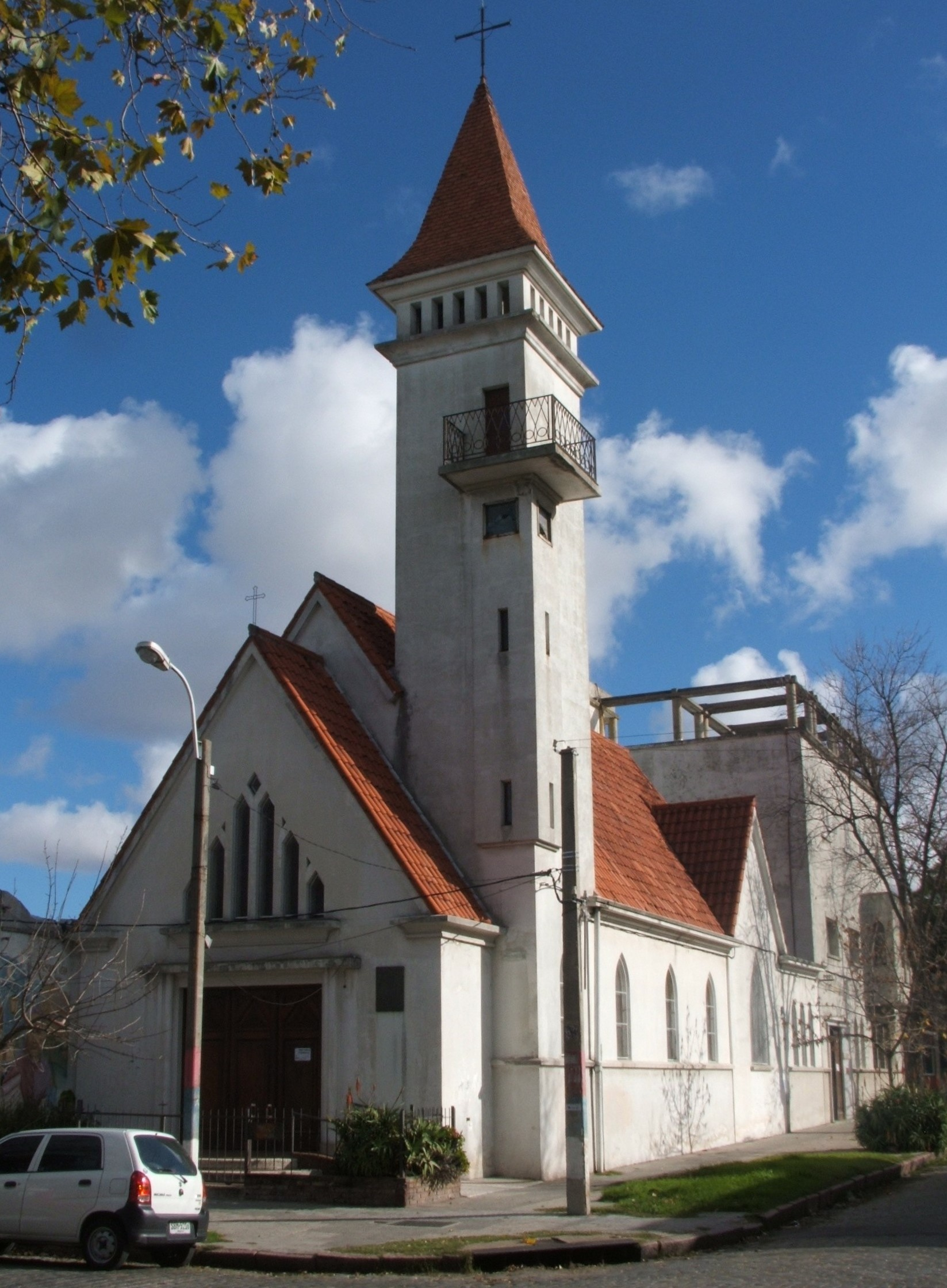
St. Antoninus Church
