= La Comercial =

- Barrio
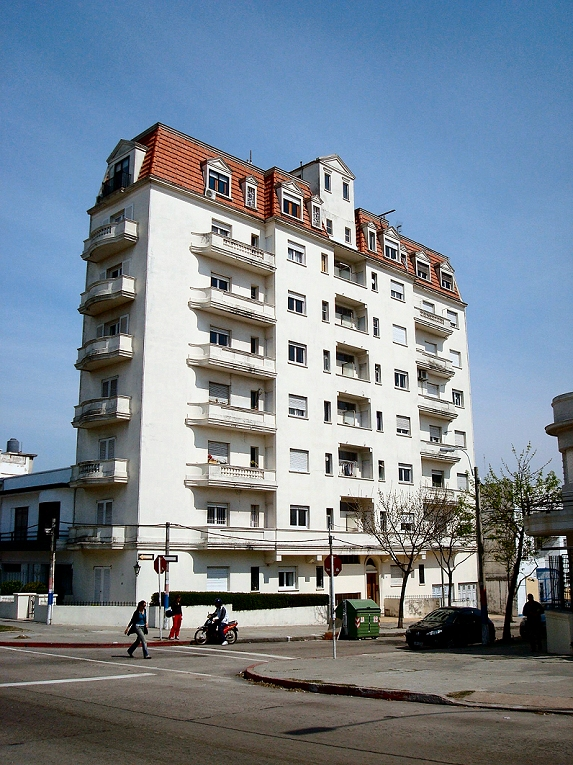
- Apartment building in La Comercial

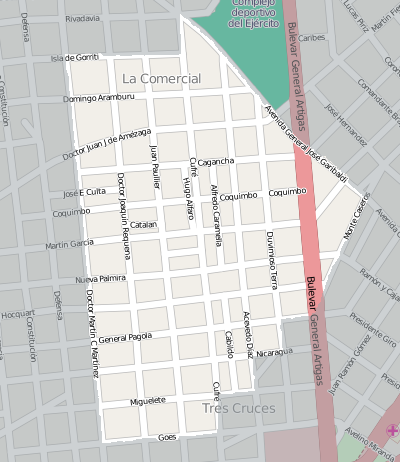
- Street map of La Comercial

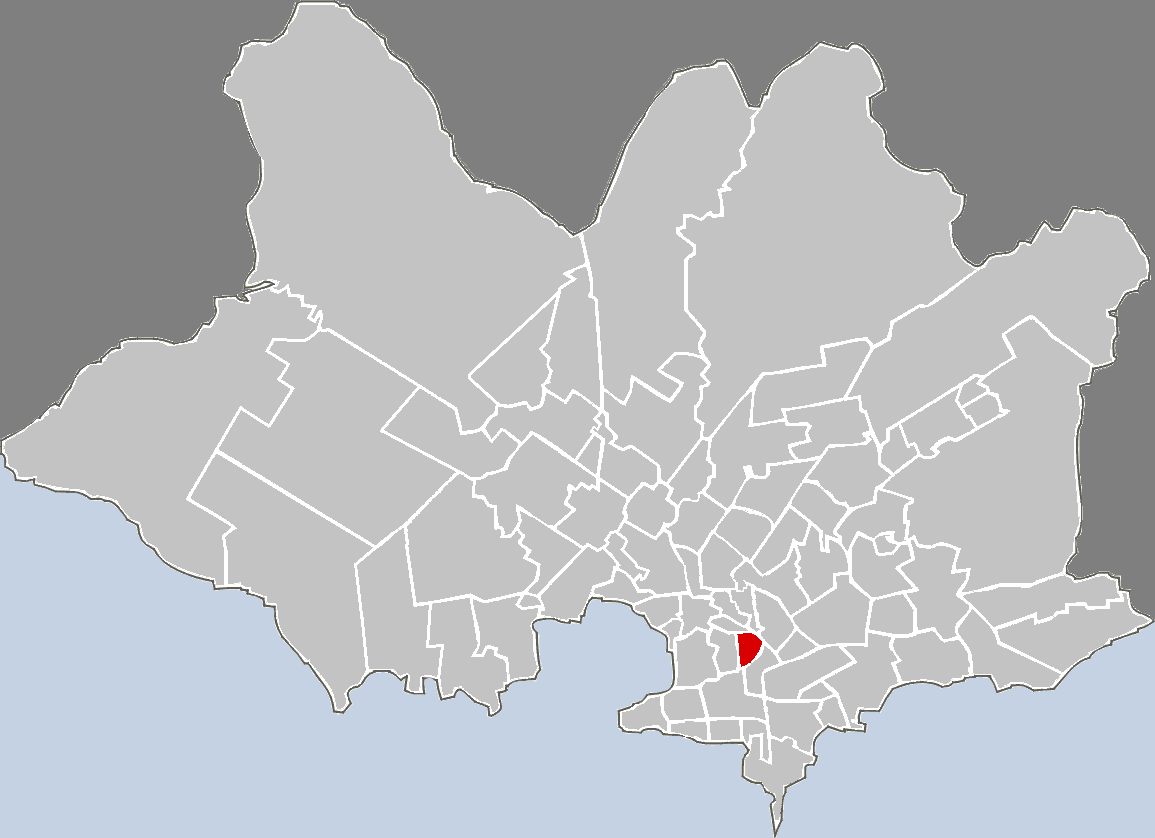
- Location of La Comercial in Montevideo
- Coordinates: 34°53′12″S 56°10′10″W
- Country: Uruguay
- Department: Montevideo Department
- City: Montevideo

La Comercial is a barrio (neighbourhood or district) of Montevideo, Uruguay.

== Location ==
It borders Villa Muñoz to the west, La Figurita and Jacinto Vera to the north, Larrañaga and Tres Cruces to the east and Tres Cruces and Cordón to the south.

== Places of worship ==
- Parish Church of Our Lady of Bzommar (Roman Catholic)
- Church of Our Lady of Luján, known also as "San Expedito" (Roman Catholic)

== See also ==
- Barrios of Montevideo
