= Liberal Union (Uruguay) =

Uruguayan defunct political party

The Liberal Union (Spanish: Unión Liberal) was a short-lived Uruguayan political party established in 1855, as a manifestation of the current of opinion known as fusion politics. Andrés Lamas was one of its leading theoretical exponents.

The so-called “doctors” sought to pacify the territory and leave behind the evils caused by the continuous internal conflicts that reached their peak in the Uruguayan Civil War (1843–1851). They considered caudillismo and the economic exploitation of the countryside to be the causes of the Republic's ills and advocated the creation of a new political party that would eliminate the old warring factions. This is how the Liberal Union was born, considered a “party of ideas,” which sought to replace the traditional parties with a single great current of thought.
