= Reus al Norte =

Historic housing area in the Villa Muñoz neighborhood of Montevideo, Uruguay

Coordinates: 34°53′1.6″S 56°10′45″W

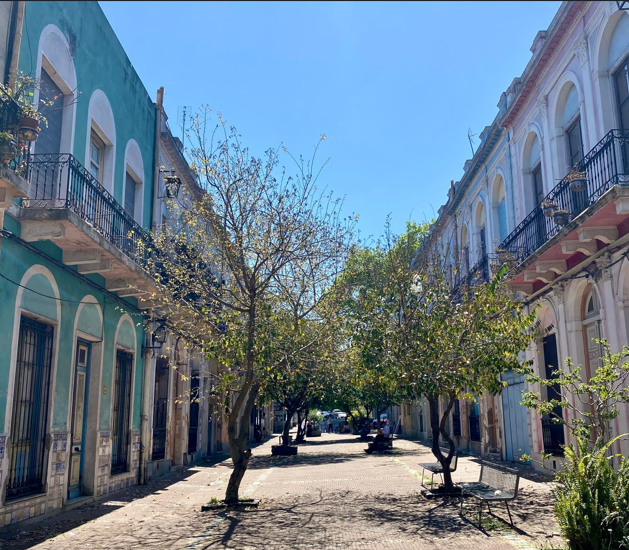
Emilios Reus St. in 2024

Reus al Norte is a historic housing area in the Villa Muñoz neighborhood of Montevideo, Uruguay. Built in the late 1880s and spread over in four urban blocks, it is the core of the city's Jewish quarter, and is known for its pastel-coloured houses.

== History ==
It was planned and built in the late 1880s by Spanish businessman Emilio Reus, who aimed to provide an alternative housing option during the city's expansion. Construction work was delayed due to the construction company's financial problems. In the baring crisis, the business went bankrupt, and the company was integrated into the capital of the newly created Banco Hipotecario del Uruguay, which was responsible for the completion of the works and the subsequent sale of the houses.

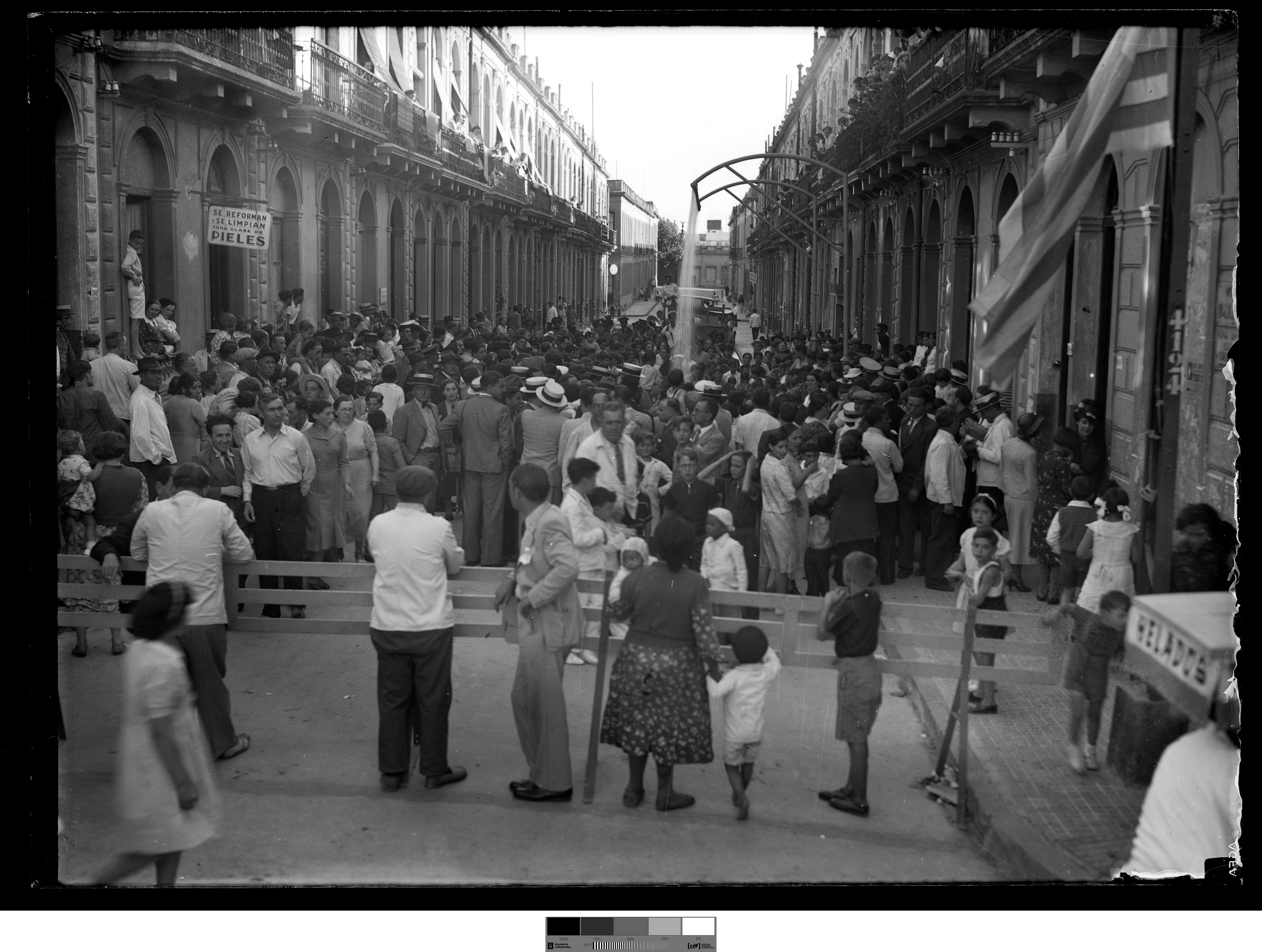
A neighbouring event in the 1940s

The area consists of pedestrian streets flanked by two-storey modernist and pastel-coloured houses. Due to the low housing prices, the area was attractive to immigrants arriving in the country at the end of the 19th century. The vast majority of the houses were purchased by Ashkenazi Jews, who began to set up synagogues, mikvehs and Jewish institutions throughout Villa Muñoz, which became the Jewish Quarter of Montevideo.

During the first decades of the 20th century, Yiddish was the predominant language spoken in Reus al Norte, which was mixed with local Spanish and the languages of other migrant communities in Uruguay, such as Italian and Galician.

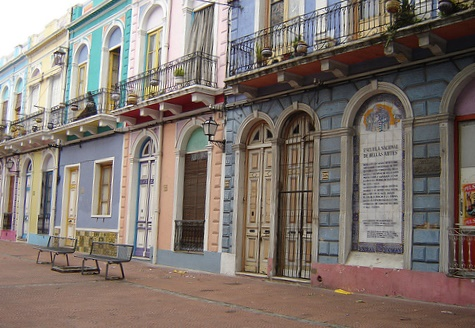
Reus al Norte coloured houses

With the establishment of a large number of Jewish-owned wholesale stores throughout the Villa Muñoz neighborhood, Reus al Norte became a quiet housing area in the middle of a major and busy commercial shopping district.

Emilio Reus St., which runs from south to north through the middle of the area, is pedestrianized and is the most recognized and therefore the most frequented street.

== In popular culture ==
=== Film ===
- In 2010, the documentary El Barrio de los Judíos was released, which tells stories of the children and grandchildren of the neighborhood's first residents.
- In the 2011 film Reus, the story revolves around two feuding Jewish families living in the area. In 2023, its sequel, Reus, la vuelta al barrio, was released.

=== Television ===
- In the Max comedy-drama series Margarita, one of the main characters lives in one of the pastel-colored houses of the Emilio Reus St. Reus al Norte was also the filming location for the music video for the series' single “Corazones Rojos”.

== See also ==
- History of the Jews in Uruguay
