= Graciela Stefani =

Argentine actress

Graciela Stefani (born 12 May 1963 (age 63)) is an Argentine screen and stage actress who portrayed Malala Torres-Oviedo de Santillán in Floricienta, a telenovela based on the Cinderella story. She also gives drama classes.

== Filmography ==
Year	Film	Role	Other notes
1983	Yolanda Luján	Maribel	
1984	Lucía Bonelli	Dora	
1985	Mujer Comprada	Susa	
1995	Montaña Rusa, Otra Vuelta	Jennifer	
1995	Chiquititas	Beautiful Woman	
1997	Señoras y Señores	Raquel	
1998	Gasoleros	Rita	
1998	Casa Natal	Patricia	
1999	Libre-mente	Tula	
2001	El Sodero de mi Vida	Inés	
2002	Rebelde Way	Gabriela Miranda	
2003	Malandras	Agustina	
2003	Soy Gitano	María Julía Gavilán 'La Gavilana'	
2004-2005	Floricienta	Malala Torres-Oviedo Viuda de Santillán	
2004	La Ley del Amor	Elena	
2007	Casi Ángeles	Malala Torres-Oviedo Viuda de Santillán	
2007	Terapias Alternativas	Alicia	
2008	Una de Dos	Lidia	
2008	Don Juan y Su Bella Dama	Jolie	
2012-2013	Mi amor, mi amor	Viviana "Vivi" Bonicatto	
2020	Tunel Vision		
2024-2026	Margarita	María Laura "Malala" Torres-Oviedo	
2025	Homo Argentum	Nancy	Movie
