= Reducto =

- Barrio
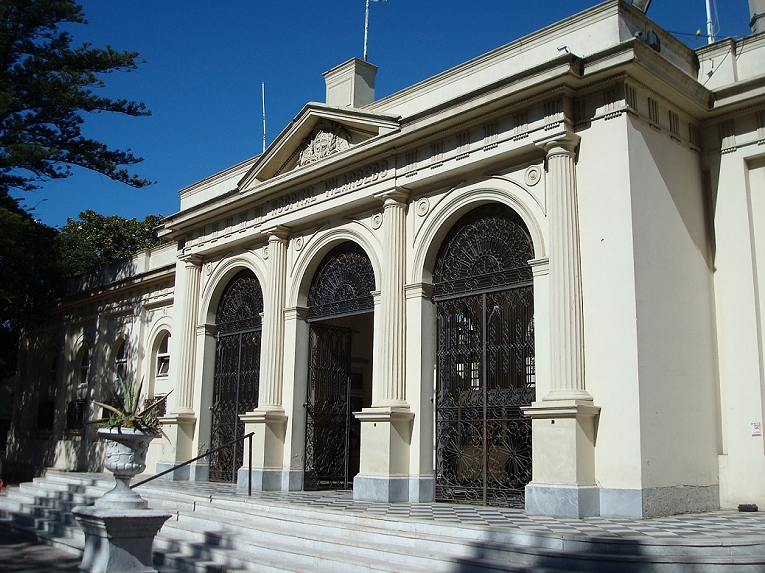
- Hospital Vilardebó in Reducto

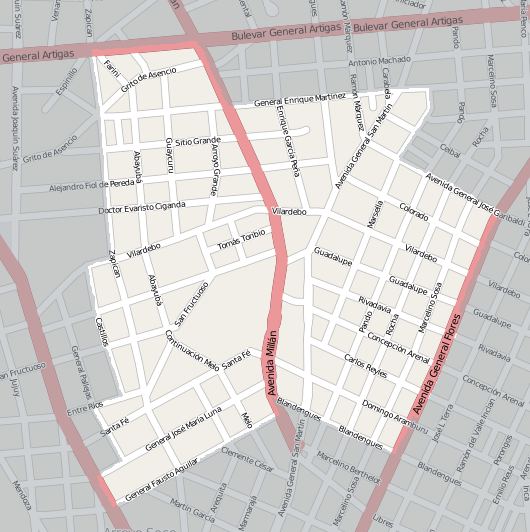
- Street map of Reducto

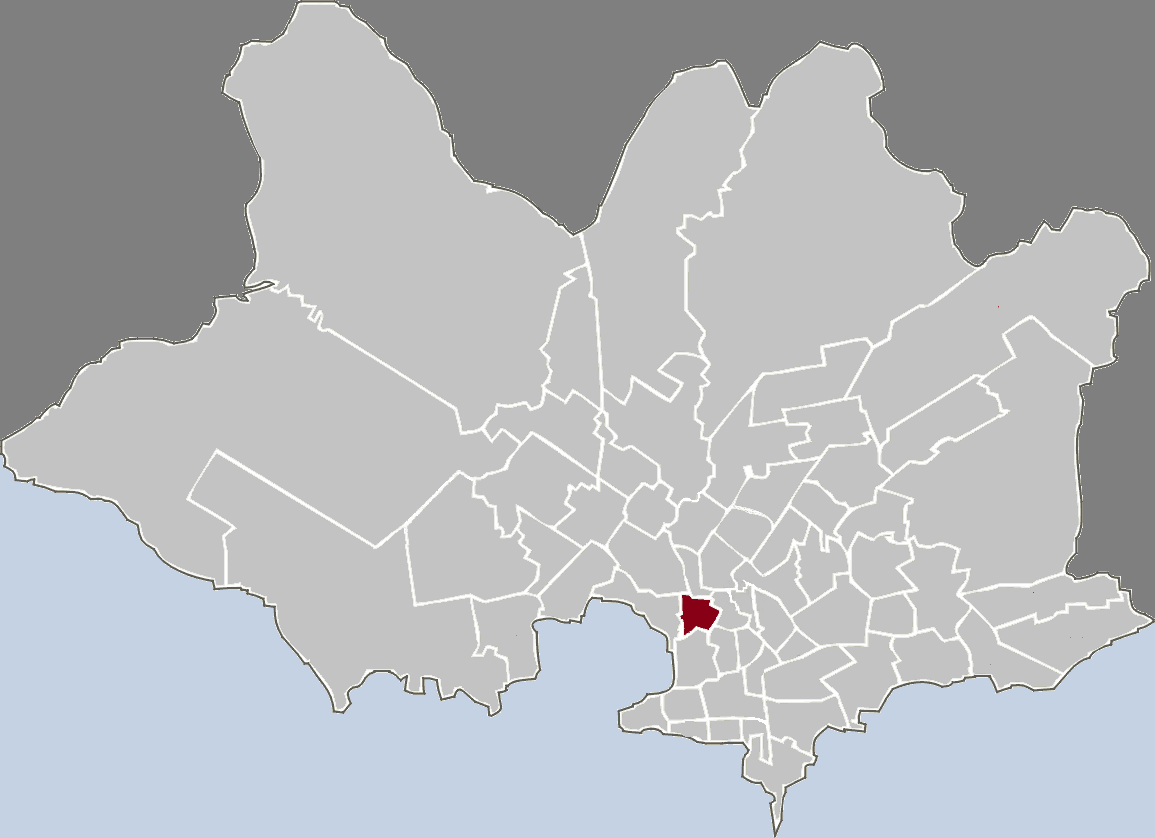
- Location of Reducto in Montevideo
- Coordinates: 34°49′33″S 56°11′12″W
- Country: Uruguay
- Department: Montevideo Department
- City: Montevideo

Reducto is a barrio (neighbourhood or district) of Montevideo, Uruguay. It borders Bella Vista to the west, Prado and Atahualpa to the north, La Figurita and Villa Muñoz to the east and Aguada to the south.

== Location ==
Its main streets are Millan Avenue and San Martin Avenue, while General Flores Avenue runs along its east border.

== History ==
1867 map of Reducto compared to an actual street map

Reducto appears in maps long before the urbanization of the area. Its name means redoubt and indeed, in 1831, during the second siege of Montevideo, a redoubt was built there by General José Rondeau, at the spot where the actual San Martín Avenue meets Burges Avenue. In 1837 a small church was built at the corner of the actual San Martín Avenue and Vilardebó, and in 1875 the Iglesia del Reducto was built in its actual place, in front of Plaza General Eugenio Garzón. At that time there about 4000 inhabitants living in Reducto.

== Notable landmarks ==
- Hospital Vilardebó
- Escuela Alemania

Two more landmarks that used to belong to Reducto, i.e. the Iglesia del Reducto and the Hospital Español, now fall inside the limits of barrio La Figurita.

== See also ==
- Barrios of Montevideo
