= Instituto Histórico y Geográfico del Uruguay =

Uruguayan institution that studies history and geography

The Historical and Geographical Institute of Uruguay (Spanish: Instituto Histórico y Geográfico del Uruguay, acronym IHGU) is a learned society based in Montevideo, Uruguay. Its objectives include researching and disseminating information related to Uruguayan history and geography, organising courses and conferences, publishing brochures and books, publishing its institutional magazine, and advising the Government on matters within its remit. Its aims also include the protection and conservation of monuments and historical sites, archives, libraries, museums and other elements of cultural heritage.

It was established by Andrés Lamas and Teodoro Vilardebó on 25 May 1843 when, by decree issued in Montevideo, the Government took the institute under its special protection and patronage. The law was passed during the XXV Legislature on 21 June 1916, promulgated by the Executive Power on the 27th of the same month and year. With legal status, the IGHU is a member of the Pan American Institute of Geography and History and the Union Académique Internationale.

The IGHU publishes a journal, Revista del Instituto Histórico y Geográfico del Uruguay.

In 2023, to mark the 180th anniversary of the institution's establishment, the Uruguayan National Postal Administration issued a commemorative postage stamp dedicated to the IHGU.
