= Hospital Vilardebó =

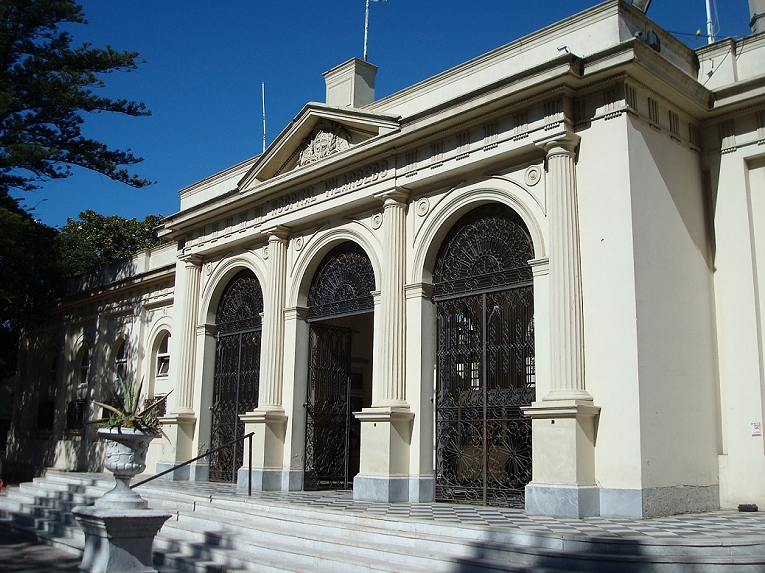
- Hospital Vilardebó, main entrance

Geography
- Location: Avenida Millán 2515, Montevideo, Uruguay
- Coordinates: 34°52′45″S 56°11′18″W

Organisation
- Care system: Public
- Type: Psychiatric hospital

Services
- Beds: 300

History
- Founded: 1880

Hospital Vilardebó is the only psychiatric hospital in Reducto, Montevideo, Uruguay. It opened on 21 May 1880, named after the physician and naturalist Teodoro Vilardebó. The hospital was originally one of the best of Latin America and in 1915 grew to 1,500 hospital inpatients. Today the hospital is very deteriorated, with broken walls and floors, lack of medicines, beds, and rooms for the personnel. It has an emergency service, outpatient, clinic and internal rooms and employs approximately 610 staff, psychologists, psychiatrists, social workers, administrators, guards, among others. The average patient age is 30 years, more than half of whom arrive by court order; 42% have schizophrenia, 18% have depression and mania and also a high percentage of drug addicted patients. It has around 300 beds.
