= Andrés Lamas (writer) =

Uruguayan politician, writer, diplomat and historian

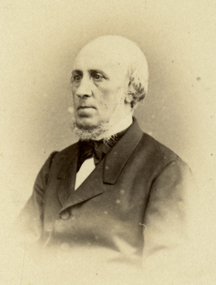
Andrés Lamas in 1866.

José Andrés Lamas Alfonsín (Montevideo, 10 November 1817 – Buenos Aires, 23 September 1891) was a Uruguayan lawyer, journalist, politician, writer, diplomat, historian, and collector.

He had a notable career: he helped establish two newspapers, the Uruguayan Historical and Geographical Institute (together with the physician and naturalist Teodoro Vilardebó), the Institution of Public Education, and the short-lived party Liberal Union. He also served as Ambassador to the Empire of Brazil, twice as government minister, etc. Besides, he was a great collector of documents and books.

== Selected works ==
- Colección de memorias y documentos (1849)
- Apuntes históricos sobre las agresiones del dictador argentino D. Juan Manuel de Rosas contra la Independencia de la República Oriental del Uruguay (collection of articles published in 1845 for Montevideo's El Nacional newspaper and compiled in 1849)
- A politica do Brasil no Rio da Prata (1859)
- La Revolución de mayo de 1810 (1872)
- Biblioteca del Río de la Plata o colección de obras, documentos y noticias (1873)
- Instrucciones para la adquisición en los archivos europeos de documentos inéditos que puedan ilustrar la historia colonial del Río de la Plata (1873)
- Don Bernardino Rivadavia (1882)
- El escudo de armas de la ciudad de Montevideo (1903)
- El Génesis de la Revolución e Independencia de la América Española (1891)
- Revista del Río de la Plata, a monthly magazine, with Juan María Gutiérrez and Vicente Fidel López
- Carta de Esteban Echeverría a Andrés Lamas (17-5-1844))
