= Teodoro Vilardebó =

Uruguayan physician, naturalist and historian

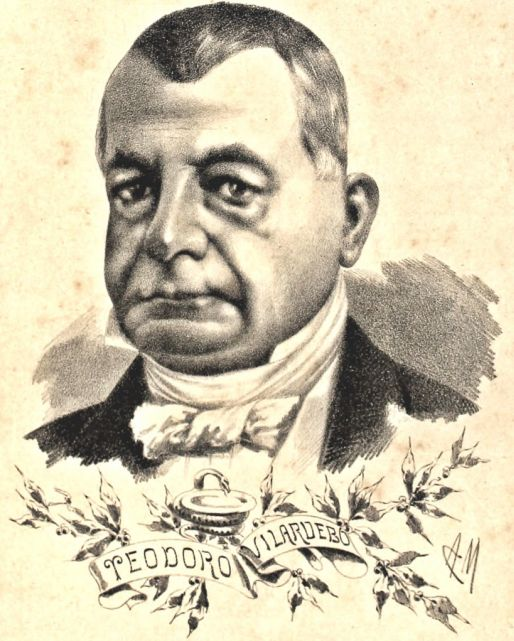
Teodoro Vilardebó in 1884.

Teodoro Miguel Simón Vilardebó Matuliche (Montevideo, 9 November 1803 – 29 March 1857) was a Uruguayan medical doctor, naturalist and historian of Catalan and Croatian descent.

== Biography ==
His father was the Catalan sailor Miguel Antonio Vilardebó. His mother was Martina Matuliche, a Uruguayan whose surname was the Spanish version of Matulić, of Croatian origin (she was the daughter of Šime Matulić, a native of the island of Brač).

While Uruguay was involved in its independence war, the Vilardebó family escaped to Rio de Janeiro and his father sent him to Barcelona to study medicine. Later he graduated in 1830 from the University of Paris. Back in Uruguay, in 1833 he validated his medical degree and began practising medicine as one of the first professionals in the country in this field.

Among other activities, Vilardebó undertook research of historical documents in the National Library of Uruguay. Together with Andrés Lamas, he helped establish the Uruguayan Historical and Geographical Institute. He was also passionate about natural history and fossils. He compiled a list of words in the Charrúa language, the Codex Vilardebó.

Vilardebó passed away due to a yellow fever epidemic, spreading from Brazil.

The Hospital Vilardebó, the only psychiatric hospital in Uruguay, is named after him.

== Bibliography ==
- Mañé Garzón, Fernando (1989). Teodoro M. Vilardebó (1803-1857) Primer médico uruguayo (in Spanish). Montevideo: Academia Nacional de Medicina del Uruguay.
