= Larrañaga, Montevideo =

Larrañaga
- Barrio
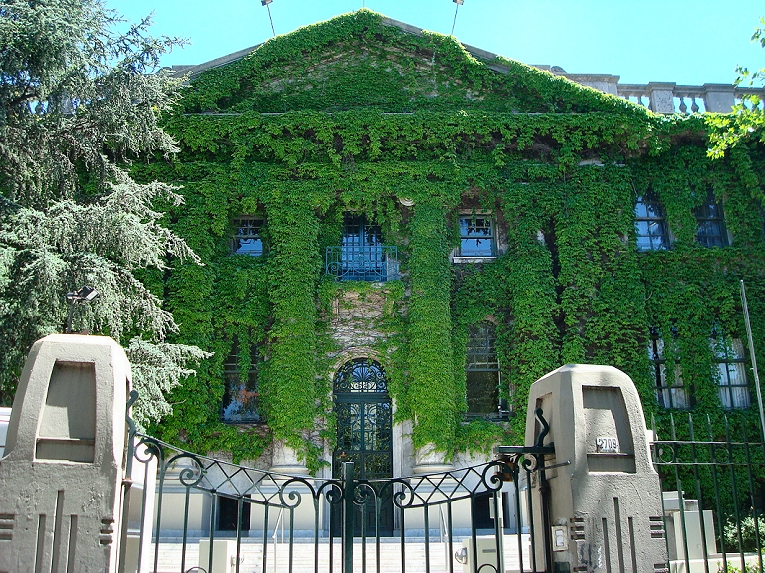
- The Crandon Institute

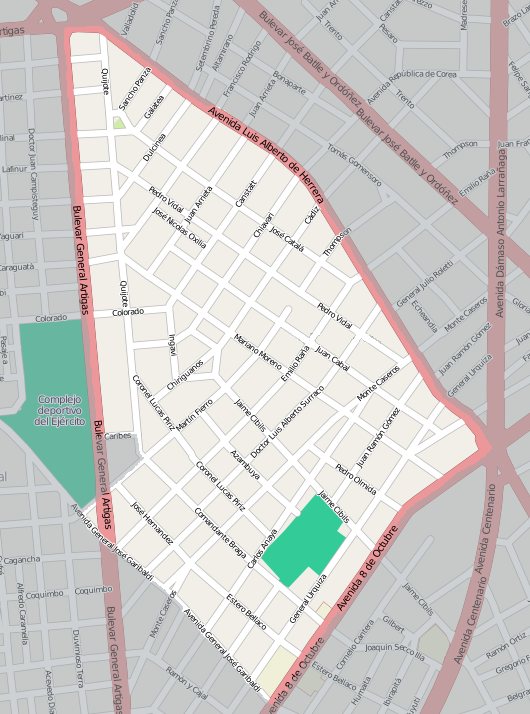
- Street map of Larrañaga

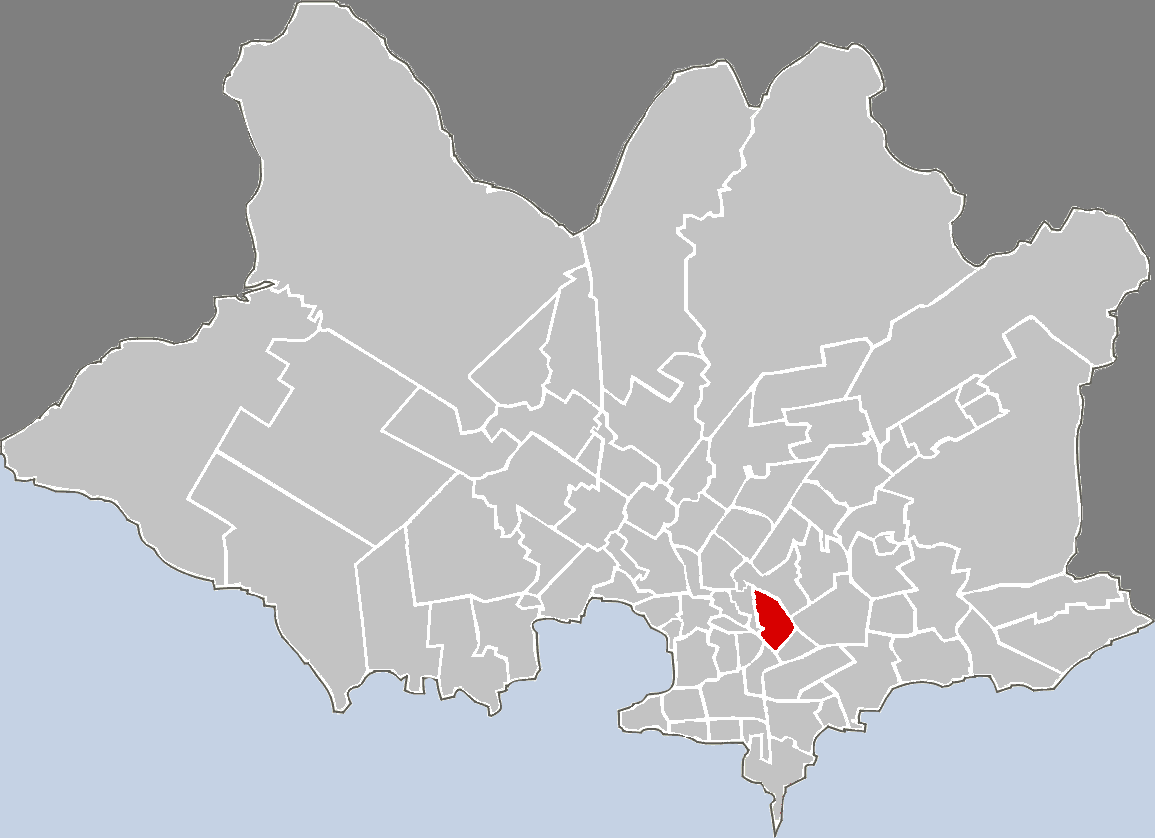
- Location of Larrañaga in Montevideo
- Coordinates: 34°52′50″S 56°9′40″W
- Country: Uruguay
- Department: Montevideo Department
- City: Montevideo

Larrañaga is a neighbourhood or Barrio of Montevideo, Uruguay.

== Location ==
This barrio borders Jacinto Vera to the west, Bolívar to the north and northeast, Unión to the east, La Blanqueada to the southeast and Tres Cruces and La Comercial to the southwest.

== Landmarks ==
Larrañaga is home to the Estadio Gran Parque Central, seat of the football team Club Nacional de Football and the National Television of Uruguay station (former "Canal 5 SODRE"), as well as to the central seat of the Catholic University of Uruguay.

== Places of worship ==
- Parish Church of Our Lady of Sorrows, popularly known as "Tierra Santa", Av. 8 de Octubre 2757 (Roman Catholic)
- St. Paul Methodist Church, Av. Garibaldi 2661 (Methodist)
- Waldensian Evangelical Church, Av. 8 de Octubre 3039 (Waldensian)
- Local Spiritual Assembly, Br. Artigas 2440 (Bahá'í)

== Images ==
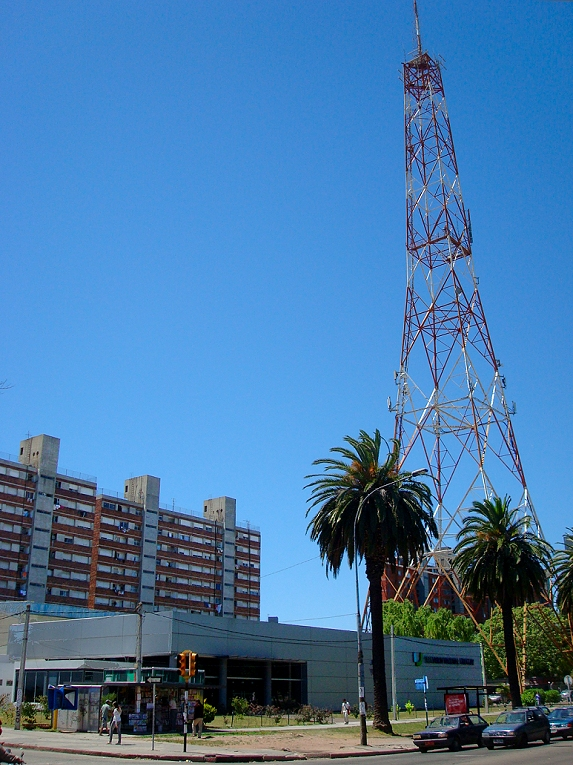
National Television Canal 5, in Larrañaga

== See also ==
- Barrios of Montevideo
