= Nuestra Señora de los Dolores y San Isidro Labrador, Libertad =

Roman Catholic parish church in Libertad, San José Department, Uruguay

Coordinates: 34.6314°S 56.6169°W

Iglesia de Nuestra Señora de los Dolores y San Isidro Labrador

Religion
- Affiliation: Roman Catholic
- Ecclesiastical or organizational status: Parish church

Location
- Location: San José 982; Libertad, Uruguay
- Interactive map of Iglesia de Nuestra Señora de los Dolores y San Isidro Labrador

Architecture
- Type: Church

The Church of Our Lady of Sorrows and Saint Isidore the Laborer (Spanish: Parroquia Nuestra Señora de los Dolores y San Isidro Labrador) is a Roman Catholic parish church in Libertad, San José Department, Uruguay.

This parish was established in 1922. It is held by the Missionary Oblates of Mary Immaculate. The temple is dedicated to Our Lady of Sorrows and saint Isidore the Laborer.
