= Libertad, Uruguay =

Libertad
- City
- Location in Uruguay
- Coordinates: 34°38′0″S 56°37′9″W
- Country: Uruguay
- Department: San José Department
- Founded: 1872

Population (2011 Census)
  - Total: 10,166
- Time zone: UTC -3
- Postal code: 80100
- Dial plan: +598 4345 (+4 digits)

Libertad is a small city in the San José Department of southern Uruguay. Its main commercial street is 25 de Agosto and its central square is Plaza Treinta y Tres Orientales.

== Geography ==
The city is located on Route 1, about 50 kilometers from Montevideo

== History ==
It was founded in November 1872. On 8 November 1902, by Decree, it was declared a "Pueblo" (village). On 1 July 1953, its status was elevated to "Villa" (town) by the Act of Ley Nº 11.964, and on 15 October 1963, to "Ciudad" (city) by the Act of Ley Nº 13.167.

== Population ==
In 2011 Libertad had a population of 10,166.

Year	Population
1908	5,609
1963	5,072
1975	6,107
1985	7,032
1996	8,353
2004	9,196
2011	10,166

Source: Instituto Nacional de Estadística de Uruguay

== Places of worship ==
- Parish Church of Our Lady of Sorrows and St. Isidore the Laborer (Roman Catholic, Missionary Oblates of Mary Immaculate)
