= François Bayrou =

Prime Minister of France from 2024 to 2025

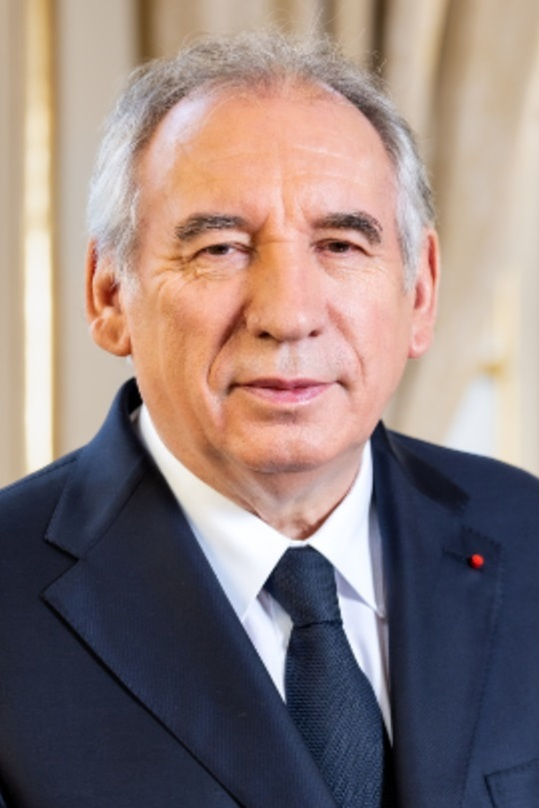
- Official portrait, 2025

Prime Minister of France
- In office 13 December 2024 – 9 September 2025
- President: Emmanuel Macron
- Preceded by: Michel Barnier
- Succeeded by: Sébastien Lecornu
Ministerial offices
Minister of Justice
In office 17 May 2017 – 19 June 2017
Prime Minister	Édouard Philippe
Preceded by	Jean-Jacques Urvoas
Succeeded by	Nicole Belloubet
Minister of National Education
In office 29 March 1993 – 4 June 1997
Prime Minister	Édouard Balladur; Alain Juppé
Preceded by	Jack Lang
Succeeded by	Claude Allègre

Mayor of Pau
- In office 4 April 2014 – 27 March 2026
- Preceded by: Martine Lignières-Cassou
- Succeeded by: Jérôme Marbot

President of the Democratic Movement
- Incumbent
- Assumed office 2 December 2007
- Preceded by: Position established

President of the European Democratic Party
- Incumbent
- Assumed office 13 July 2004
- Preceded by: Position established

President of the Union for French Democracy
- In office 25 February 1998 – 30 November 2007
- Preceded by: François Léotard
- Succeeded by: Position abolished
Parliamentary offices
Member of the National Assembly for Pyrénées-Atlantiques's 2nd constituency
In office 19 June 2002 – 19 June 2012
Preceded by	Pierre Menjucq
Succeeded by	Nathalie Chabanne
In office 12 June 1997 – 21 December 1999
Preceded by	Pierre Laguilhon
Succeeded by	Pierre Menjucq
In office 2 April 1986 – 1 May 1993
Preceded by	Majority vote
Succeeded by	Pierre Laguilhon
Member of the European Parliament
In office 20 July 1999 – 20 June 2002
Constituency	France
Local offices
President of the General Council of Pyrénées-Atlantiques
In office 2 April 1992 – 23 March 2001
Preceded by	Henri Grenet
Succeeded by	Jean-Jacques Lasserre
Member of the General Council of Pyrénées-Atlantiques
In office 26 March 1982 – 21 March 2008
Preceded by	Yves Urieta
Succeeded by	André Arribes
Constituency	Canton of Pau-Sud

Personal details
- Born: François René Jean Bayrou; 25 May 1951 (age 75) Bordères, France
- Party: MoDem (since 2007)
- Other political affiliations: CD (1974–1976); CDS (1976–1995); FD (1995–1998); UDF (1978–2007)
- Spouse: Élisabeth Perlant (m. 1971)
- Children: 5
- Education: University Bordeaux Montaigne
- Website: Official website

François René Jean Bayrou (French: [fʁɑ̃swa bajʁu]; born 25 May 1951) is a French politician who served as Prime Minister of France from December 2024 to September 2025. He has presided over the European Democratic Party (EDP) since 2004 and the Democratic Movement (MoDem) since 2007. A centrist, he was a candidate in the 2002, 2007 and 2012 presidential elections.

From 1993 to 1997, Bayrou was Minister of National Education in three successive governments. He was also a member of the National Assembly for a seat in Pyrénées-Atlantiques from 1986 to 2012 with brief interruptions and a Member of the European Parliament (MEP) from 1999 to 2002. He has been mayor of Pau from 2014 to 2026.

It was speculated that Bayrou would be a candidate in the 2017 presidential election, but he decided not to run and instead supported Emmanuel Macron, who – after winning the election – named him Minister of State and Minister of Justice in the government headed by Édouard Philippe. On 21 June 2017, he resigned from the government amid an investigation into the MoDem's allegedly fraudulent employment of parliamentary assistants, initiated earlier that month. He was cleared of wrongdoing in 2024.

On 13 December 2024, he was appointed as prime minister by Emmanuel Macron after the Barnier government was brought down by a vote of no confidence. He himself was brought down by a confidence vote, and submitted his resignation on 9 September 2025. Polls had shown he had become the most unpopular prime minister under the Fifth Republic.

== Early life and education ==
Bayrou was born 25 May 1951 in Bordères, Pyrénées-Atlantiques, a village located between Pau and Lourdes. He is the son of farmer Calixte Bayrou (1909–1974), MRP mayor of Bordères from 1947 to 1953, and Emma Sarthou (1917–2009). Bayrou descends from an ancestry of primarily Occitans except from his maternal grandmother's side which is Irish.

When Bayrou was in his youth, he developed a stutter which led to him attending speech therapy for seven years. He first went to secondary school in Pau, before transferring to Bordeaux. He studied literature at university, and at the age of 23, sat the "agrégation", the highest qualifying level for teachers in senior high schools and preparatory classes in France. Around the same time, his father was killed in a tractor accident. After studying at Bordères primary school, he obtained a baccalaureate in classical literature (French, Latin, and Greek) in 1968 from the public high school of Nay-Bourdettes. He continued his studies in literary preparatory classes at the Lycée Michel de Montaigne in Bordeaux, then at the University of Bordeaux-III, where in 1972 he wrote a master's thesis on Charles Péguy's The Mystery of the Charity of Joan of Arc. In 1974, he obtained the agrégation (academic qualification) in classical literature and then taught in Pau until 1979.

Bayrou married Élisabeth Perlant, also known as "Babette", in 1971. He and Perlant have five children, Hélène, Marie, Dominique, Calixte and Agnès. The children were raised on the farm where Bayrou was born and where Bayrou currently lives with Perlant.

Prior to embarking on his political career, Bayrou taught history in Béarn in the French Pyrenees. He has written several books on politics and history, including one on King Henry IV of France. Bayrou's hobby is raising horses. He is a practising Roman Catholic but strongly supports France's system of secularism (French: laïcité).

== Political career ==
=== First steps in politics: 1974–2002 ===
When Bayrou did not participate in May 68, he was active in nonviolent movements and followed Gandhi disciple, Lanza del Vasto. Despite his religious convictions, he did not join the Jeunesse Étudiante Chrétienne. From the early 1970s, he was a member of the Amitié Charles Péguy, which he cites as his intellectual references.

He entered politics in 1974, after his agrégation in classical literature, joining the Democratic Centre (CD) of Jean Lecanuet, candidate in the 1965 presidential election against General de Gaulle. The party became the Centre of Social Democrats (CDS) in 1976, and François Bayrou is considered Lecanue's "scribe".

Bayrou, a member of the Centre of Social Democrats (CDS), the Christian-democratic wing of the Union for French Democracy (UDF) confederation, was elected to the General Council of the Pyrénées-Atlantiques department in 1982 in the canton of Pau-Sud, then the French National Assembly four years later. After the victory of the RPR/UDF coalition in the 1993 legislative election, he became Education Minister in the cabinet led by Édouard Balladur. In this post, he proposed a reform allowing local authorities to subsidise private schools, which caused massive protests and was quashed by the Constitutional Council.

In 1989, after poor results in both the municipal elections and the European Parliament elections, Bayrou and twelve other centre-right parliamentarians including Philippe Séguin, Michel Noir, Alain Carignon, Étienne Pinte, Michel Barnier, François Fillon, Charles Millon, Dominique Baudis, François d'Aubert, Philippe de Villiers and Bernard Bosson demanded reform of the system at the RPR and the UDF, criticising the most prominent politicians of these parties including former president Valéry Giscard d'Estaing and Prime Minister Jacques Chirac. They called for the formation of a new right-wing party to unite the UDF and the RPR into a single entity. Ideological differences between members of this group led to members leaving, though d'Estaing endorsed Bayrou to become UDF general secretary in 1991. With Bernard Bosson and Dominique Baudis, as well as the leadership of the Centre for Social Democrats (CDS), François Bayrou also decided to support the dissident list "The Centre for Europe" in the European elections, led by Simone Veil, against the RPR-UDF union list, led by the former President Valéry Giscard d'Estaing.

Despite supporting Édouard Balladur's candidacy in the 1995 presidential election, Bayrou remained Education Minister following Jacques Chirac's election and the formation of a new government headed by Alain Juppé. Following the majority for the Plural Left in the 1997 legislative election, Bayrou returned to opposition and became president of the UDF in 1998, transforming it into a unified party rather than a union of smaller parties.

=== Positioning of the UDF as a centrist party: 2002–2007 ===
In 2002 François Bayrou rejected proposals to merge the UDF with the Rally for the Republic (RPR), into a new entity that later became the Union for a Popular Movement (UMP). As a result, many UDF members left to join the UMP. Bayrou was increasingly critical of the direction taken by the UMP-led government, which he described as out of touch with the average Frenchman. He denounced the de facto two-party system, in which the Socialist Party and the RPR (later UMP) alternate. Instead, Bayrou called for a pluralist system in which other parties would also contribute.

On 16 May 2006, Bayrou supported a motion of no confidence sponsored by Socialist deputies calling for the resignation of Prime Minister Dominique de Villepin's government following the Clearstream affair. As de Villepin's UMP had an absolute majority in the National Assembly, the motion failed. Following Bayrou's support for this measure, France's television authority classified him as a member of the parliamentary opposition for timing purposes. However, after Bayrou protested, he was classified as a member of neither the majority nor the opposition.

=== Second presidential campaign: 2007 ===
Bayrou contested the presidency again in 2007. Most commentators had expected the election to be fought primarily between Nicolas Sarkozy and Ségolène Royal of the Parti Socialiste. However, Bayrou's increasing support in polls in February complicated the "Sarko-Ségo" scenario, and led to speculation that the Parti Socialiste candidate would fail to progress to the second round for a second consecutive election, following the defeat of former Prime Minister Lionel Jospin in 2002 by National Front leader Jean Marie Le Pen. Ultimately, Bayrou finished in third place in the election with 18.57% of the vote (6,820,119 votes), behind Sarkozy and Royal, the best performance by the UDF in a presidential election since 1981. Bayrou declared that he could not endorse either Sarkozy or Royal in the second round, although he indicated that Sarkozy was the worse of the two.

=== Foundation of the Democratic Movement: 2007–2012 ===
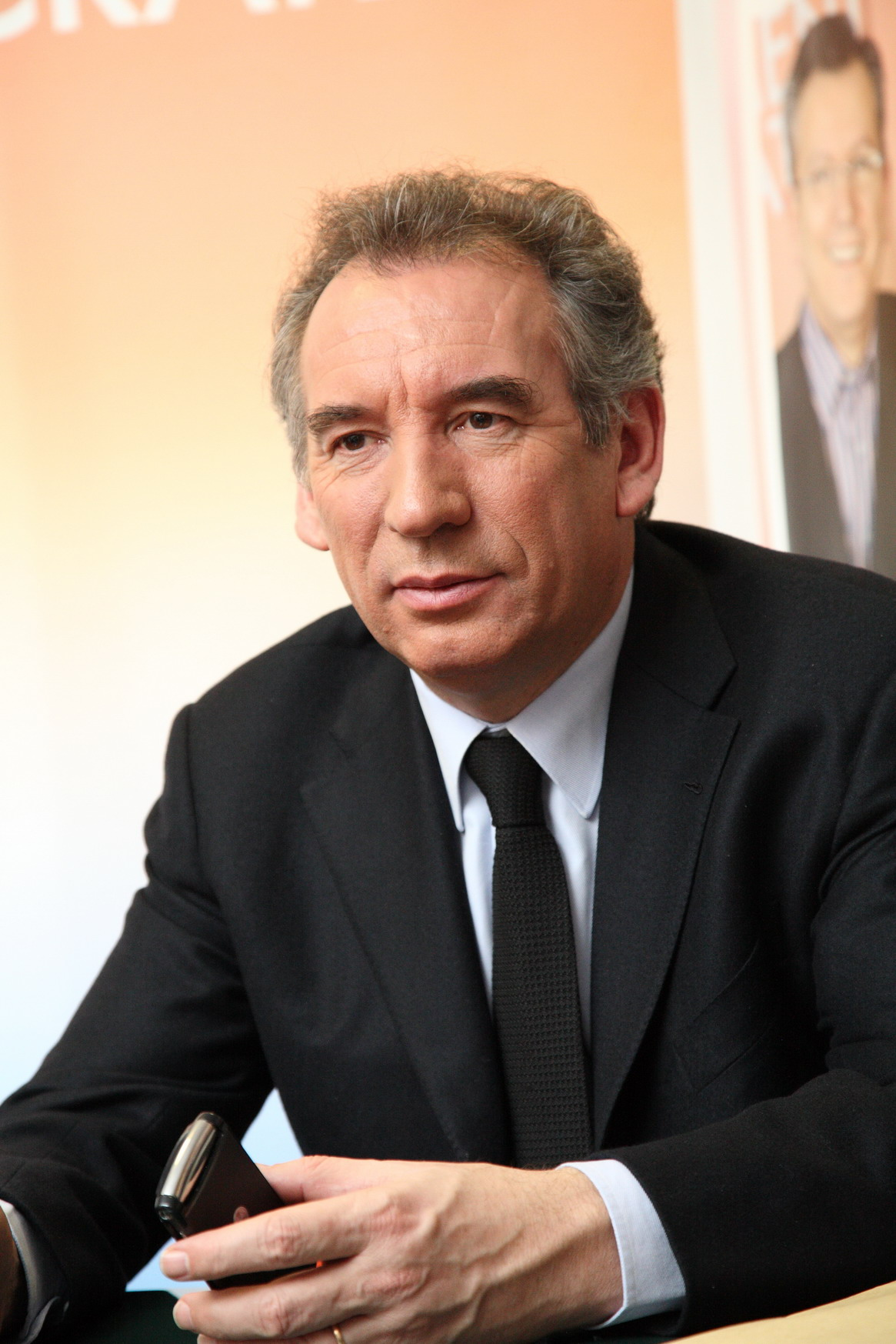
Bayrou in 2010

After the 2007 election, Bayrou intended to form a new centrist party, the Democratic Movement (MoDem). The majority of UDF politicians did not follow him, and instead formed a rival party, the New Centre, which pledged to support an alliance with the UMP. However, most of the UDF's grassroots membership remained with Bayrou and joined MoDem. In the subsequent legislative elections in June 2007, MoDem came third with 7.6% of the vote. Although an increase on the UDF share of the poll of 4.9% in the 2002 elections, MoDem won only four seats, including Bayrou's own seat. The other parliamentarians elected on the party's list were Jean Lassalle, Thierry Benoit (who has since left the party, to join the New Centre) and Abdoulatifou Aly. The establishment of MoDem led to the formal dismantling of the UDF alliance on 30 November.

=== Third presidential election: 2012 ===
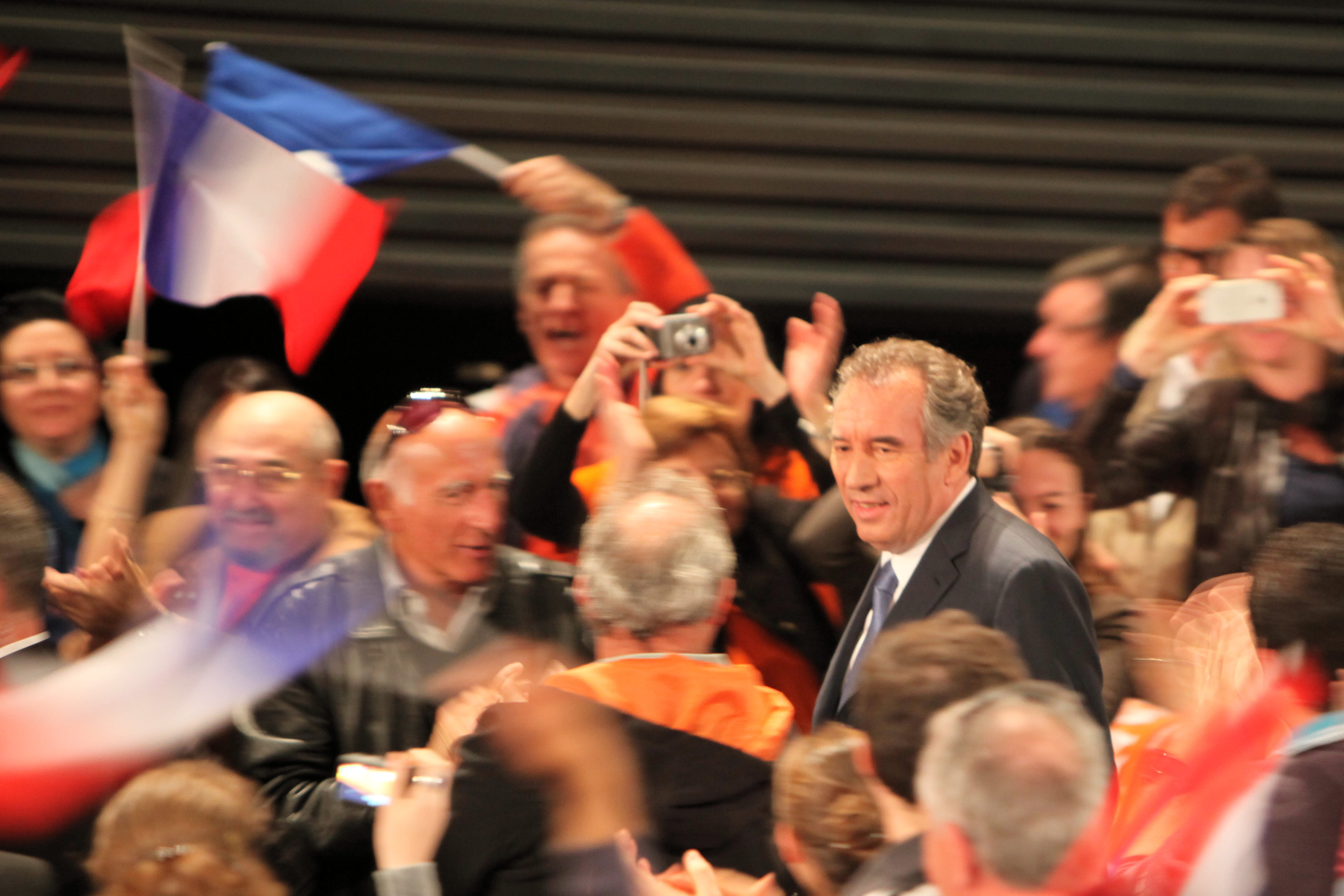
Bayrou at a meeting in Marseille in April 2012

On 18 August 2011, Bayrou released a book, 2012. Etat d'urgence, in which he discussed how and why the 2008 financial crisis happened, and outlined the top priorities of his next presidential program: production and education.

François Bayrou confirmed his candidacy for the 2012 presidential election on 25 November 2011, in an interview with journalist Laurence Ferrari on her show Parole Directe on TF1.

His supporters included:

- Jean Arthuis, president of the Centrist Alliance, president of the Senate Finance Committee (2002–2011)
- Bernard Bosson, Mayor of Annecy (1977–2007), member of the National Assembly of France for Haute-Savoie (1986–2007)
- Pierre Albertini, Mayor of Rouen
- Anne-Marie Idrac, Secretary of State for International Trade under Nicolas Sarkozy (2008–2010)
- Alain Lambert, Budget Minister (2002–2004)
- Daniel Garrigue, member of the National Assembly of France for Dordogne and former press secretary for Dominique de Villepin
- Jean-François Kahn, author and former director of the newspaper Marianne

Bayrou was eliminated in the first round, receiving around half of his vote share from 2007; he endorsed Socialist François Hollande in the runoff.

=== 2017 presidential election ===
On 22 February 2017, Bayrou stated that he would not contest the 2017 presidential election, instead endorsing the centrist candidate Emmanuel Macron of En Marche!. The alliance surprised French political pundits and rival candidates. Part of the agreement was Macron's commitment to support a clean government law proposed by Bayrou. Bayrou said that France was "at extreme risk", requiring an "exceptional response", adding that the alliance did not mean that MoDem would be subsumed by En Marche!

=== Minister of Justice (2017) ===
On 17 May 2017, Bayrou was appointed as Minister of Justice in the first Philippe government.

Le Canard enchaîné published information that Democratic Movement politician Marielle de Sarnez had been paid for work she had not actually done, embroiling Bayrou in a scandal about fictitious jobs. France Info later reported that MoDem had "over a dozen" fictitious jobs in the European Parliament.

Bayrou resigned several days before the 2017 legislative election, only 35 days after he had taken the post. He was found not guilty of those accusations in February 2024.

=== Later career ===
In September 2020, Bayrou was appointed as high commissioner for planification by Prime minister Jean Castex.

In February 2022, Bayrou created what he calls a "sponsorship bank", joined by a few hundred local officials, willing to give their signatures to candidates for the presidential election struggling to obtain them, even if they represent a large part of the public according to opinion polls, including far-right candidate Marine Le Pen.

Following the appointment of Gabriel Attal as Prime Minister in January 2024, Bayrou stated that he would not be joining the government; he had been widely expected to return to the cabinet after he was acquitted of fraud charges shortly before.

=== Prime Minister (2024–2025) ===
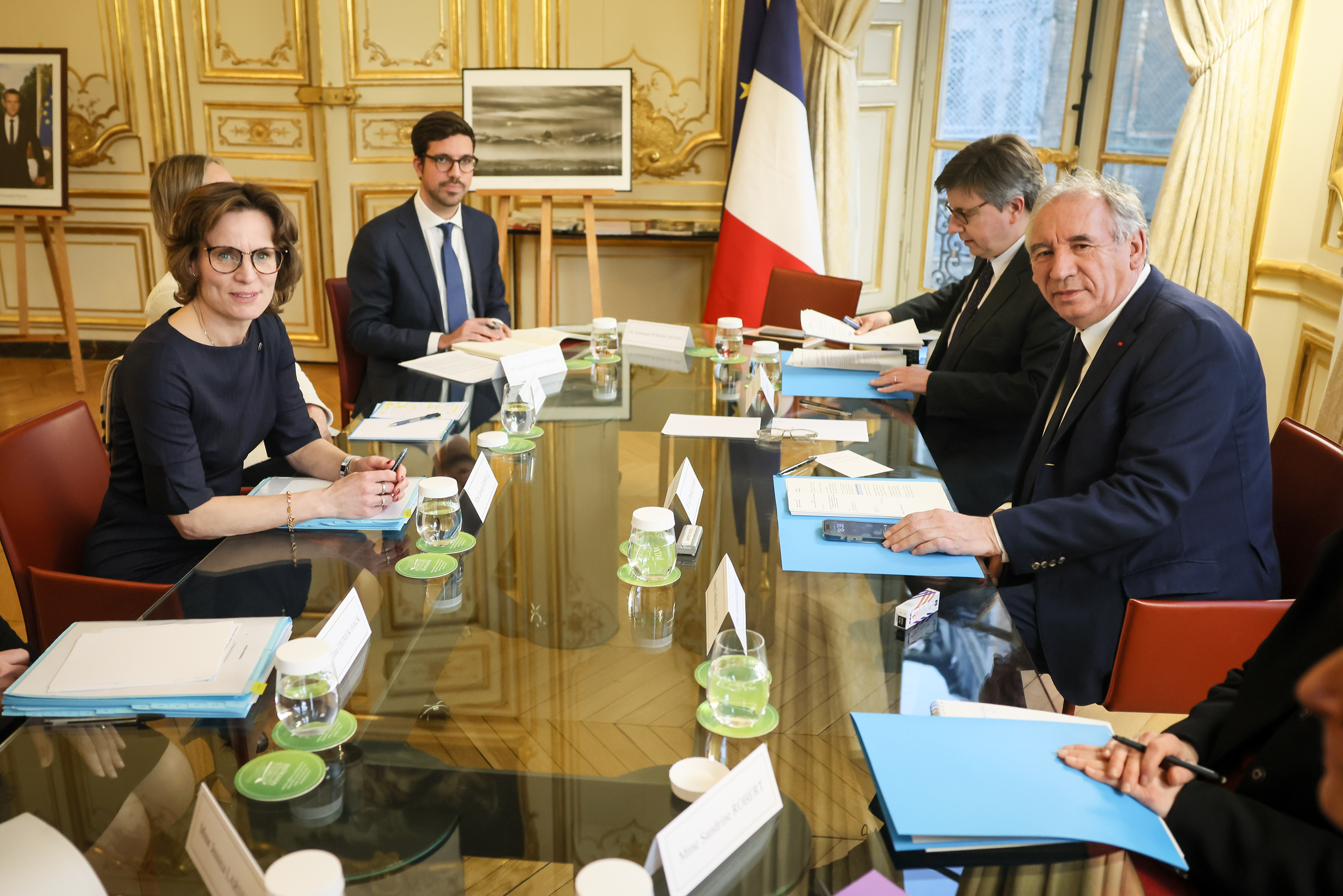
Bayrou meeting European commissioner Jessika Roswall, in January 2025

On 13 December 2024, following the motion of no confidence that ended Michel Barnier's government, Bayrou was appointed as Prime Minister by Emmanuel Macron. The morning of the nomination, Macron reportedly informed Bayrou that he had decided against nominating him, only to revise his position when a furious Bayrou threatened to withdraw his support for the government.

Despite his nomination, Bayrou has pledged to remain in office as Mayor of Pau, similarly to Jacques Chirac, who served simultaneously as Prime Minister and Mayor of Paris from 1986 to 1988. Less than a week after his nomination, he faced criticism after flying to Pau on a presidential Falcon 7X jet to attend a session of the municipal council, rather than visiting Mayotte, which had been heavily affected by Cyclone Chido.

On the same day, during the transfer of power with his predecessor Barnier, Bayrou recalled that he had always warned in his political life about the question of debt and public deficits and affirmed that he was facing a "Himalaya of difficulties". He declared that "reconciliation is necessary", quoting the Henry IV of France, from Béarn like him and whose birthday it was.

Bayrou's government was finalized on 23 December, maintaining the goal Bayrou had set of appointing his ministers before Christmas.

On 30 December 2024, Bayrou visited Mayotte with several government members and announced several emergency measures to rebuild the islands' infrastructures and to resolve the local crisis.

On 3 February 2025, Bayrou passed his government's budget for the year after bypassing a vote in the National Assembly through special constitutional powers. This led to two unsuccessful no-confidence motions being launched against him on 5 February and 10 February. He survived another a no-confidence motion filed by the Socialist Party following the failure of negotiations over pension reform on 2 July.

A long-time advocate of proportional representation for legislative elections, in April 2025 he initiated a series of consultations with political parties with a view to preparing a bill on the subject. His initiative met with strong resistance within the government majority, notably from the Republicans – whose president, Bruno Retailleau, threatened to resign from his ministerial duties – and Édouard Philippe's Horizons, who cited a risk of chronic political instability. Continuing his action, Bayrou announced that a text on proportional representation would be presented after the budget work, at the end of 2025 or the beginning of 2026, and did not rule out resorting to a referendum to decide the question, standing up to his divergent partners.

On 15 July 2025, Bayrou proposed discontinuing the observance of Easter Monday and V-E Day as public holidays as part of cost-cutting measures under the proposed 2026 budget. At the same time, he made the sustainability of public finances and public debt his priority. In mid-July 2025, during a press conference, he unveiled a strict plan of €43.8 billion in savings to reduce the deficit to 4.6% of GDP in 2026.

On 8 September 2025, the National Assembly voted against confidence in Bayrou's government by a margin of 364 votes to 194. Several parties refused to support Bayrou due to his refusal to negotiate or compromise on his highly controversial budgetary proposal. This was the second government appointed by President Macron to be ousted in a year, and the first government in the history of the Fifth Republic to lose a self-imposed motion of confidence. Bayrou submitted his resignation to Macron on 9 September.

== Political views ==
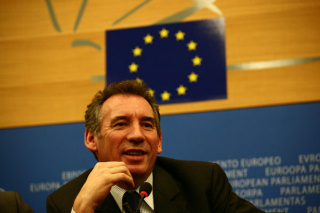
Bayrou in Strasbourg in 2007

Bayrou has been a vocal campaigner on a variety of issues, including reform of the political process, civil liberties, and free software (see DADVSI). During the 2007 presidential election campaign he described the European Union as "the most beautiful construction of all humanity". He called for France to play a greater role in the European Union's affairs, and supports the ratification of a European Constitution, in a more concise and readable form than the one voted down by the French electorate in 2005.

In an interview with The New York Times in 2007, Bayrou said: "I am a democrat, I am a Clintonian, I am a man of the 'third way'". He positioned himself as a centrist, although he has historic ties to the right. His platform emphasises job creation, improvement of educational standards, improved conditions in the troubled suburbs, reduced government spending, a balanced budget and a stronger European Union, with France as its de facto leader. He has also criticized China's protection of the Sudanese government from UN Security Council sanctions. Bayrou was highly critical of the American economic model under George Bush and of the unregulated free market in general. He described the United States economic model as a "survival of the fittest" system, where it was often stated that money was people's only motivation, where higher education was too expensive, and where the middle class was shrinking. Bayrou criticized the Iraq war, saying it was "the cause of chaos" in the region.

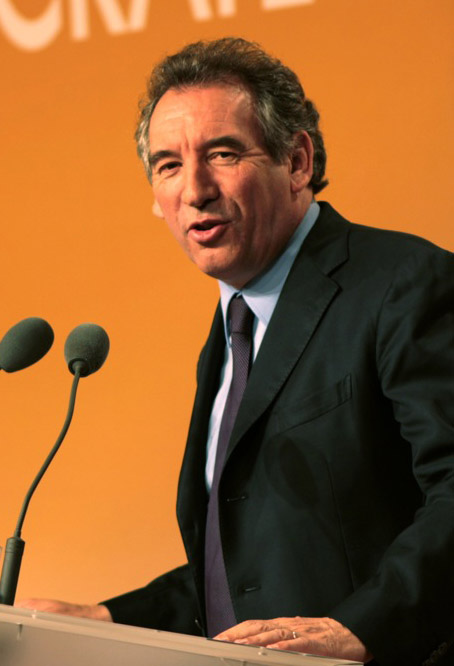
Bayrou in 2009

He criticized Nicolas Sarkozy's foreign policy, including the invitation of Libyan leader Muammar Gaddafi for a week-long state visit to France and the signing of military cooperation agreements with Libya.

In 2009, he criticized statements by Pope Benedict XVI claiming that condoms promote AIDS on a journey to Cameroon. Bayrou called the remarks "unacceptable", adding that "the primary responsibility, particularly of Christians, is the defence of life...This [Africa] is a continent in which tens of millions of women and men are dying."

He called for France to boycott the 2008 Summer Olympics, due to the poor human rights record in China and political unrest in Tibet. During a rally in Paris on 21 March he said that "if this drama does not stop, France would do itself credit by not coming to the Olympic Games", criticising China's opposition to sanctions against Sudan over its involvement in the humanitarian crisis in Darfur.

Bayrou is fluent in Béarnese and often expresses his support for regionalism.

In July 2025, François Bayrou declared himself in favour of the constitutional bill, providing for the autonomy of Corsica within the French Republic.

=== Bétharram scandal and Bayrou's involvement ===
The Bétharram scandal refers to a case of child sexual abuse committed in the Catholic congregation of the Bétharram Fathers, as revealed by journalistic investigations. This Catholic congregation is in full communion with Rome and has followed all of the liberal reforms of the clergy. The abuses spanned several decades and involved clergy members operating in various schools and shelters linked to the institution. François Bayrou is accused of deliberately ignoring reports of child abuse, defending an institution accused of systemic violence, and helping to obstruct the work of whistleblowers and journalists.

In April 2025, Bayrou's daughter Hélène Perlant revealed that a senior priest at Notre-Dame de Bétharram had beaten her publicly in the 1980s when she was 14. She said that she had never told her father about the assault, adding, "Bétharram was organised like a sect or a totalitarian regime, putting psychological pressure on pupils and teachers so they stayed silent." Two hundred legal complaints have been filed since February 2024 alleging physical or sexual abuse by priests and staff at Bétharram during the period 1957–2004, including an allegation of gang rape committed by two priests. Some of the complaints led to criminal charges; others exceeded the legal statute of limitations for prosecution in France.

== Bibliography ==
Bayrou is the sole author unless other names are mentioned.

- La Décennie des mal-appris. [Paris]: Flammarion. 1990. ISBN 2-08-066472-7., subject(s): Enseignement—Réforme—France—1970–, Éducation et État—France—1970–.
- Le roi libre. [Paris]: Flammarion. 1994. ISBN 2-08-066821-8. le Grand livre du mois 1994, subject(s): Henri IV (roi de France; 1553–1610) – Biographies, France—1589–1610 (Henri IV).
- Le roi libre. Paris: France loisirs. 1995. ISBN 2-7242-8944-7.
- Letamendia, Pierre (1995). Le Mouvement républicain populaire : le MRP : histoire d'un grand parti français. Paris: Beauchesne. ISBN 2-7010-1327-5., preface by François Bayrou.
- Le droit au sens. Paris: Flammarion. 1996. ISBN 2-08-067204-5., le Grand livre du mois 1996, subject(s): Politique et éducation—France—1990–, France—Conditions sociales—1981–.
- Gelly, Violaine (1996). François Bayrou : portrait. [Étrépilly]: Bartillat. ISBN 2-84100-048-6.
- Le roi libre. Paris: Éd. J'ai lu. 1996. ISBN 2-277-24183-0., series: J'ai lu 4183.
- Michelland, Antoine; Séguy, Philippe (1996). François Bayrou : "et si la Providence veut". Monaco; [Paris]: Éd. du Rocher. ISBN 2-268-02400-8.
- France. Ministère de l'éducation nationale, de l'enseignement supérieur et de la recherche (1995–1997) (c. 1996). Les États généraux de l'Université. Paris: ONISEP., preface by François Bayrou.
- France. Ministère de l'éducation nationale, de l'enseignement supérieur et de la recherche (1995–1997) (1996). Les États généraux de l'Université : intervention de François Bayrou, ministre de l'éducation nationale, de l'enseignement supérieur et de la recherche, Grand amphithéâtre de la Sorbonne, 18 juin 1996. [Paris]: [Ministère de l'éducation nationale, de l'enseignement supérieur et de la recherche].
- Saint-louis. [Paris]: Flammarion. 1997. ISBN 2-08-067208-8.
- Henri IV. [Paris]: Perrin jeunesse. 1998. ISBN 2-262-01301-2., subject(s): Henri IV (roi de France; 1553–1610 ) – Ouvrages pour la jeunesse.
- Ils portaient l'écharpe blanche : l'aventure des premiers réformés, des Guerres de religion à l'édit de Nantes, de la Révocation à la Révolution. Paris: B. Grasset. 1998. ISBN 2-246-55981-2.
- Henri IV : le roi libre. [Paris]: Flammarion. 1999. ISBN 2-08-067725-X., le Grand livre du mois 1999.
- Bayrou, François; Pierre-Brossolette, Sylvie (1999). Hors des sentiers battus : entretiens avec Sylvie Pierre-Brossolette. Paris: Hachette littératures. ISBN 2-01-235258-8.
- Ils portaient l'écharpe blanche : l'aventure des premiers réformés, des Guerres de religion à l'édit de Nantes, de la Révocation à la Révolution. Paris: Librairie générale française. 2000. ISBN 2-253-14779-6., series: Le livre de poche 14779.
- Chaline, Nadine-Josette (2000). Jean Lecanuet. Paris: Beauchesne. ISBN 2-7010-1405-0., "témoignages de François Bayrou et de Dominique Baudis", series: Politiques & chrétiens 16.
- François Bayrou, Qui êtes-vous ? Que proposez-vous ?. [Paris]: Archipel. 2001. ISBN 2-84187-283-1., series: L'Info. Citoyenne.
- Relève. [Paris]: Grasset. 2001. ISBN 2-246-61821-5.
- Oui : Plaidoyer pour la Constitution européenne. [Paris]: Plon. 2005. ISBN 2-259-20183-0.
- Au nom du Tiers-État. [Paris]: Hachette. October 2006. ISBN 2-01-237250-3.
- Projet d'Espoir. [Paris]: Plon. March 2007. ISBN 978-2-259-20162-9.
- Abus de pouvoir, [Paris] Plon, 2009 ISBN 978-2-259-20876-5
- 2012, Etat d'urgence, [Paris] Plon, 2011 ISBN 978-2-259-21661-6

Political offices
Preceded by Jack Lang	Minister of National Education; 1993–1997	Succeeded by Claude Allègre
Preceded by Jean-Jacques Urvoas	Keeper of the Seals, Minister of Justice; 2017	Succeeded by Nicole Belloubet
Preceded by Michel Barnier	Prime Minister of France; 2024–2025	Succeeded by Sébastien Lecornu
Party political offices
Preceded by François Léotard	Leader of the Union for French Democracy; 1998–2007	Position abolished
New office	Leader of the Democratic Movement; 2007–present	Incumbent
Order of precedence
Preceded by Michel Barnier as former Prime Minister	Order of precedence in France; Former Prime Minister	Succeeded by Richard Ferrand as President of the Constitutional Council
