= Palacio de los Tribunales, Montevideo =

Coordinates: 34°54′24″S 56°11′30″W

Palacio de los Tribunales
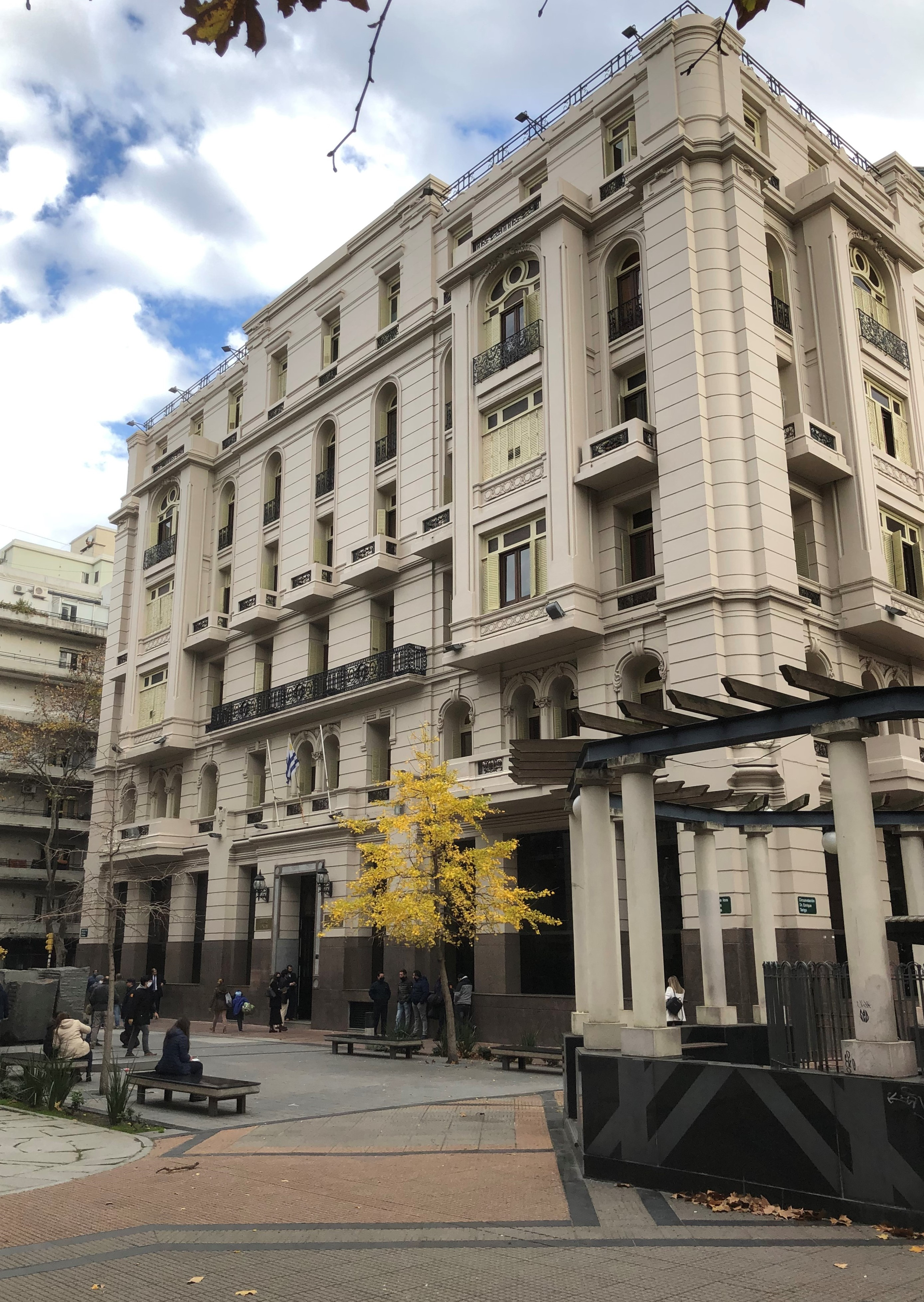
- Interactive map of the Palacio de los Tribunales area

General information
- Architectural style: Eclecticism and Beaux-Arts
- Location: 1309 Pasaje de los Derechos Humanos, Montevideo, Uruguay
- Completed: 1912
- Owner: Judiciary of Uruguay

Design and construction
- Architect: Américo Maini

Palacio de los Tribunales (English: Palace of the Courts) is a courthouse in Montevideo, Uruguay, housing the civil courts of first instance and the courts of appeals. Located in Central Montevideo, it stands on Plaza de Cagancha, opposite the Palacio Piria, seat of the Supreme Court of Uruguay.

== History ==
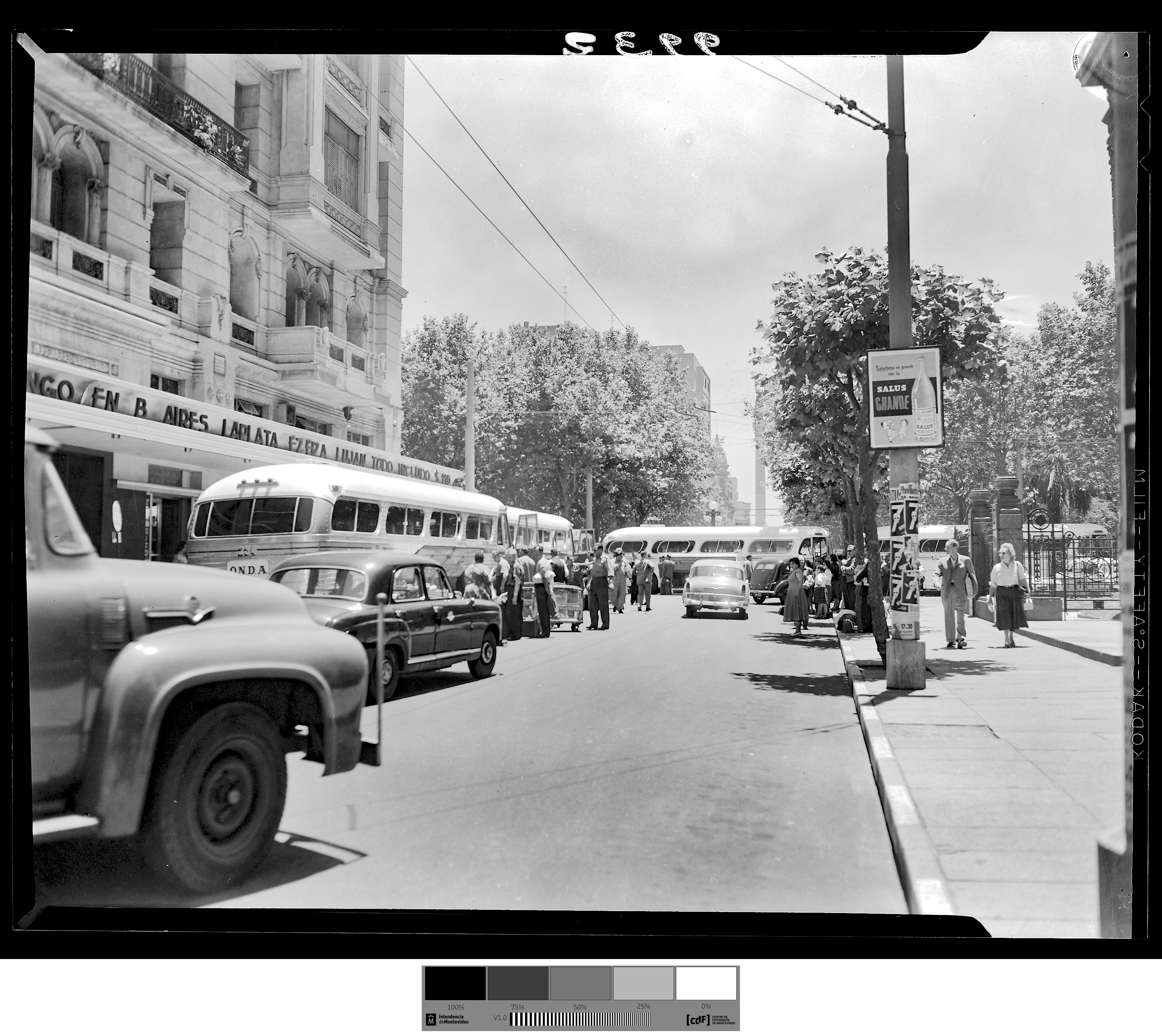
ONDA buses outside the building, 1960

The building was originally designed by architect Américo Maini to house the former Caja Mutual de Pensiones del Uruguay and was later acquired by the bus company Organización Nacional de Autobuses (ONDA), which established its headquarters there; in the absence of a central bus terminal in the city, the premises also functioned as the company's principal operations hub. Its location was particularly significant, as nearby Plaza de Cagancha marks the country's kilometre zero.

Following ONDA's closure in the 1980s, the building fell into disuse. It was subsequently purchased by the Judiciary in 1993 and underwent extensive renovations to accommodate various judicial offices. In 2007, it was officially reopened as the Palacio de los Tribunales, housing the civil courts of first instance and the civil courts of appeals.
