= San Miguel Garicoits, Montevideo =

Roman Catholic parish church in Montevideo, Uruguay

Coordinates: 34°54′17.2″S 56°11′42.3″W

Iglesia de San Miguel Garicoits (Iglesia de los Vascos)
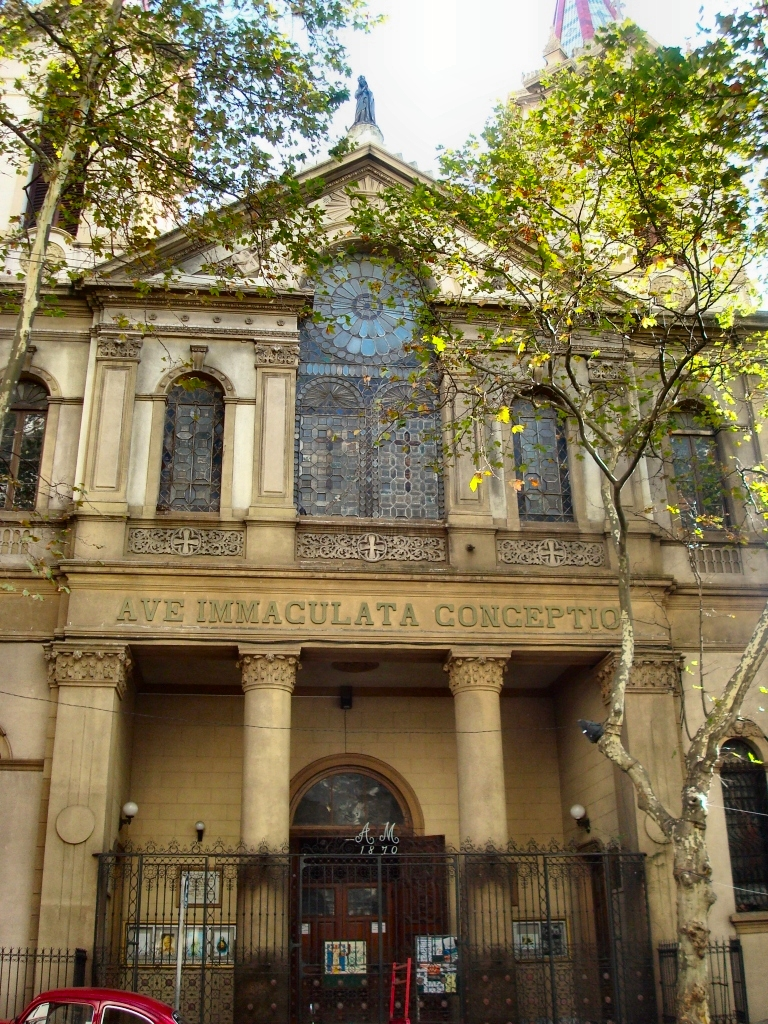

Religion
- Affiliation: Roman Catholic
- Ecclesiastical or organizational status: Parish church
- Year consecrated: 1870

Location
- Location: Julio Herrera y Obes 1431; Montevideo, Uruguay
- Interactive map of Iglesia de San Miguel Garicoits (Iglesia de los Vascos)

Architecture
- Architect: Víctor Rabú
- Type: Church
- Direction of façade: East

The Church of Saint Michael Garicoits (Spanish: Iglesia de San Miguel Garicoits), popularly known as Iglesia de los Vascos (Spanish for "the church of the Basque people") is a Roman Catholic parish church in Montevideo, Uruguay.

== History ==
The origins of this temple date back to 1856, when the first Betharram Fathers arrived. An important part of the social and religious life of Basque immigrants was linked with this church for decades; services were held in Euskera back then. The church, designed by French architect Víctor Rabú in eclectic historicist style, was consecrated in 1870.

It is dedicated to their founder, St. Michael Garicoits, and to the Immaculate Conception of the Virgin Mary (f which there is a Latin inscription over the entrance).

The parish was established on 30 October 1919.
