= Bétharram scandal =

French school abuse scandal

The Bétharram scandal (French: L'Affaire Bétharram) concerns corporal punishment and sexual abuse suffered by students at the Notre-Dame de Bétharram Catholic school, in Lestelle-Bétharram, in the Pyrénées-Atlantiques department, committed by Priests of the Sacred Heart of Jesus of Bétharram and other staff members. Several legal cases implicate members of the school.

== Overview ==
as of 2025, 200 legal complaints have been made accusing Priests of the Sacred Heart of Jesus of Bétharram and school staff of physical or sexual abuse from 1957 to 2004 at the Notre-Dame de Bétharram school, in Lestelle-Bétharram, in the Pyrénées-Atlantiques department. An official enquiry, The Bétharram Commission, was set up in 2025.

In 1996, newspapers reported on a first instance of corporal punishment that left a student with disabilities. A brief academic inspection under the Ministry of National Education concluded that there was no violence within the school.

In 1998, Father Pierre Silviet-Carricart, a former principal, was indicted for rape and sexual assault against minors; his 2000 suicide closed the criminal case, and a civil judgment was made against the school in 2003.

In October 2023, former students consulted on a Facebook group, resulting in the filing of approximately one hundred complaints.

On February 5, 2025, Mediapart reported that Prime Minister François Bayrou had intervened in 1996 with an investigating judge to defend the school and Father Carricart.

Mediapart and Libération found heated controversies from the 1990s in press archives and the school's newsletter. The absence of a general inspection since 1996 led to the establishment of a Parliamentary inquiry committee into the modalities of state control and the prevention of violence in private schools.

In 2025, more than 200 complainants reported violence and abuse, mainly occurring in the 1990s and continuing until the late 2010s. Complainants included a daughter of Prime Minister Bayrou. A large majority of the complaints from long ago cannot be prosecuted due to statutes of limitations, which opened a public debate on the statute of limitations for child abuse.

== Complaints ==
=== Sexual violence ===
Among the first 76 complaints filed with the courts in May 2024, 38 were of a sexual nature. By April 2025, there had been 90 complaints.

According to several victims, "Betharam was an ideal haven for pedophiles; there was plenty to consume on site in an isolated area".

=== Physical violence ===
In April 1996, the press revealed the different types of punishments inflicted in cases of breach of discipline. Based on the testimonies collected, several corporal punishments were denounced, such as violent slaps, kicks, punches to the head, blows to the nails with a wooden ruler, and spankings directly on the body, including with a cricket bat; some young boys had their ears or hair pulled, had their knees forced on a metal ruler until they bled, and had their nails and hair pulled out.

=== Psychological abuse ===
Students and boarders denounced psychological abuse, a world of "strictness and silence," with the slightest misdemeanor deemed inappropriate, such as a blink or a smile. "It was violence, punishment, humiliation." Relatives reported several suicides of former students of the institution. Several victims admitted in 2025 that they still experienced night terrors.

== Reaction ==
The Independent Commission on Incest and Sexual Violence Against Children (CIIVISE) believes that "Betharram is not a unique case" . As of 2023, CIIVISE recommended "that the system of systematic reporting of alerts in cases of sexual violence in sports establishments be extended to all places that welcome children" and requested a global audit of the existing alert systems in establishments welcoming children. In June 2025, Scouts et Guides de France, a Catholic scouting organisation called for its current and former members to testify if they had been victims of the regime.
