= Camille Gardelle =

French architect (1866–1947)

Camille Remy Alexandre Gardelle (Montauban, 31 July 1866 - 1947) was a French architect.

Gardelle graduated from the École des Beaux-Arts. An exponent of Eclecticism, he built a notable work in Montevideo, Uruguay:

- Palacio Pietracaprina, 1913, currently the Embassy of Brazil
- refurbishing of Castillo Soneira, 1914 (original by Víctor Rabú)
- Palacio Piria, originally a residence for Francisco Piria, nowadays headquarters of the Supreme Court of Uruguay
- Palacio Jackson, later known as Palacio Brasil
- Electoral Court

== Literature ==
- Lucchini, Aurelio (1969). Ideas y formas en la arquitectura nacional. Colección Nuestra Tierra (in Spanish). Vol. 6. Montevideo.
- Lucchini, Aurelio (1986). El Concepto de Arquitectura y su traducción a formas en el territorio que hoy pertenece a Uruguay (in Spanish). Montevideo: Universidad de la República.
