= Luis Caminetti =

- Born: Luis Caminetti Bustamante; July 18, 1930; Montevideo, Uruguay
- Died: November 5, 2018 (aged 88); Montevideo, Uruguay
- Known for: Painting
- Notable work: Puente del Riachuelo (1989)
- Style: Representational art

Luis Caminetti (Montevideo, Uruguay, 1930 – 2018) was a Uruguayan visual artist and painter known for his landscapes and expressive compositions in oil. His works are held in national museums and private collections, and he exhibited widely throughout Uruguay and Argentina over a career that spanned more than four decades.

== Biography ==
Luis Caminetti was born in 1930 in Montevideo, Uruguay. He dedicated his life to painting, developing a style rooted in representational and atmospheric themes. Caminetti participated in numerous solo and group exhibitions and gained recognition in the Uruguayan artistic scene through participation in national salons and cultural institutions.

His works form part of the collection of the Museo Nacional de Artes Visuales (MNAV) in Montevideo. He is also included in the national registry of Uruguayan creators maintained by the Agencia Nacional de Investigación e Innovación (ANII) and the Biblioteca Nacional de Uruguay.

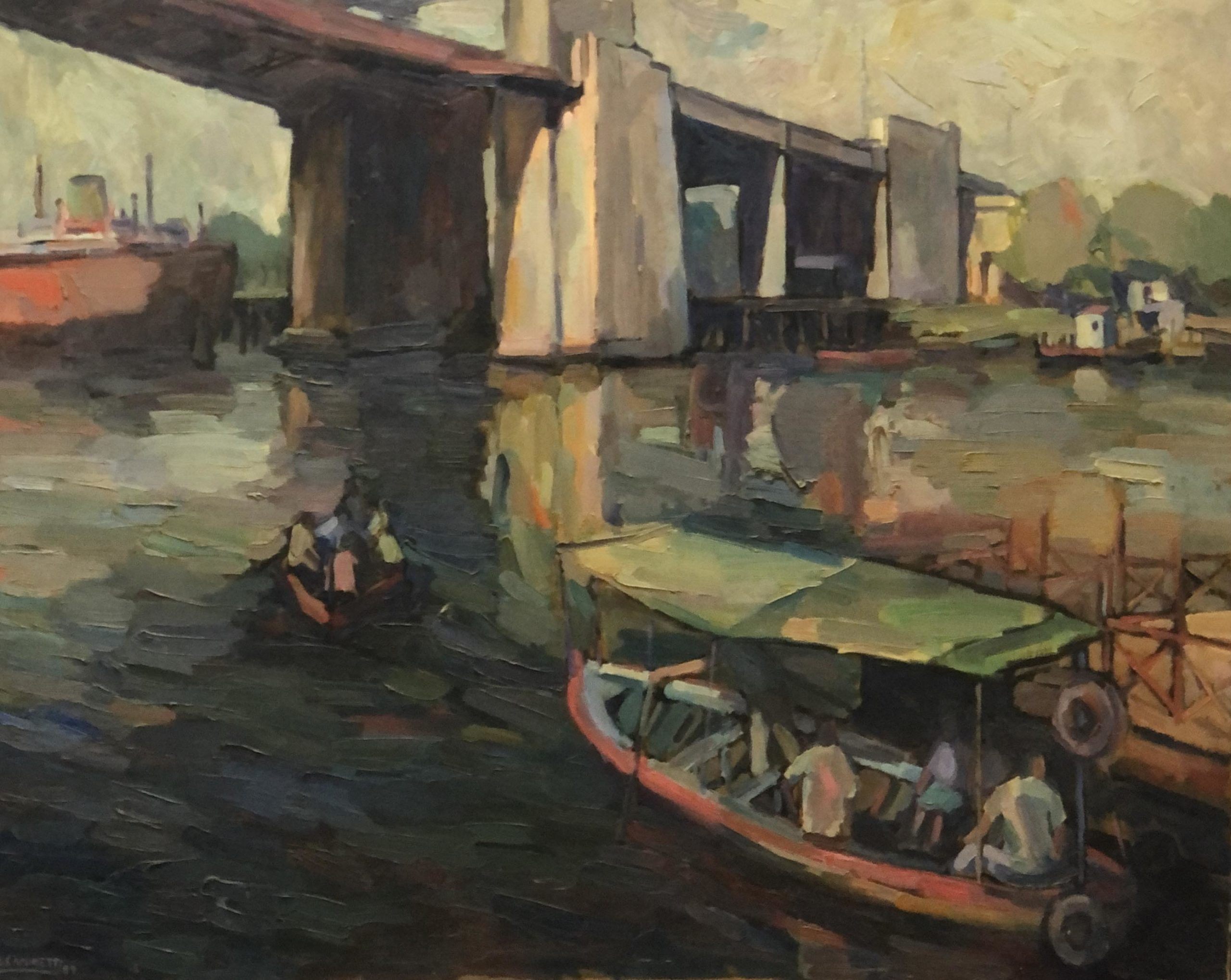
Painting "Puente del Riachuelo" (1989)

One of Caminetti’s notable paintings is Puente sobre el Riachuelo (La Boca, Buenos Aires), executed in 1989. The oil painting, on fiber support, measures 90 x 111 cm and reflects his characteristic technique of color blending and atmospheric mood.

== Selected exhibitions ==
Luis Caminetti exhibited extensively between the 1950s and 1990s. Notable exhibitions include:

- 1957 – Solo exhibition at the Ateneo de Montevideo (Uruguay)
- 1961–1963 – Salón Nacional de Pintura (Uruguay)
- 1966 – Solo exhibitions at the Jockey Club and Galería Trianon (Uruguay)
- 1967–1970 – Annual exhibitions at Asociación Cristiana de Jóvenes and Salón Primavera de Salto
- 1971 – Galería Witcomb (Buenos Aires, Argentina); Museo Departamental de San José
- 1973–1975 – Salón Nacional and Salón Municipal de Pintura (Montevideo); exhibitions in Durazno and Punta del Este
- 1978 – Solo exhibition at Galería La Candela
- 1979–1980 – Galería Ceriani; Instituto Poume; Hotel Argentino de Piriápolis
- 1983 – Bienal de Salto
- 1985 – 1st National Painting Salon, Soriano
- 1990 – Solo exhibition in Sala "Vaz Ferreira", Biblioteca Nacional (Montevideo)
- 1993–1996 – Galería Ática (Punta del Este) and Galería de la Matriz (Montevideo)
