= Michel Garicoïts =

French Roman Catholic saint

Saint Michel Garicoïts
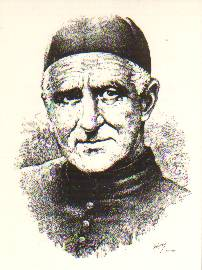

Priest
- Born: 15 April 1797; Ibarre, Pyrénées-Atlantiques, French First Republic
- Died: 14 May 1863 (aged 66); Bétharram, Pyrénées-Atlantiques, Second French Empire
- Venerated in: Roman Catholic Church
- Beatified: 10 May 1923, Saint Peter's Basilica, Kingdom of Italy by Pope Pius XI
- Canonized: 6 July 1947, Saint Peter's Basilica, Vatican City by Pope Pius XII
- Feast: 14 May
- Attributes: Priest's attire
- Patronage: Congregation of the Sacred Heart of Jesus of Bétharram; Teachers

Michel Garicoïts (15 April 1797 – 14 May 1863) was a French Basque Roman Catholic priest and the founder of the Congregation of the Sacred Heart of Jesus of Bétharram. He combated Jansenism in his parish due to the threat that it posed to the faith. He served as a teacher and preacher and was known for his ardent devotion to both the Eucharist and the Sacred Heart.

The sainthood cause commenced under Pope Leo XIII in mid-1899 while Pope Benedict XV later named him as Venerable on 10 December 1916 upon the confirmation of his heroic virtue. Pope Pius XI beatified him in 1923 while Pope Pius XII later canonized him as a saint of the Roman Catholic Church over a decade later in 1947.

== Life ==
Michel Garicoïts was born on 15 April 1797 in Saint-Just-Ibarre as the first of six children of the peasants Arnaud Garicoïts and Gratianne Etchéverry. His parents remained faithful and true to the spirit of the faith during the persecutions of the French Revolution while also doing their best to shelter priests. His father helped priests flee persecution and helped them cross the border into Spain. One brother was born after him in 1799.

In 1801 he trespassed into his neighbour's home and hurled a stone at a woman who he believed had wronged his mother before fleeing the scene. In 1802 he stole a pack of needles from a travelling salesman – his mother reprimanded him for this – and in 1804 stole an apple from his brother to his mother's disdain. In 1806 he was sent to the village school but was taken out in 1809 to work as a servant on a farm for additional income.

In his childhood he was noted for silent contemplation and for singing Psalms while guarding the cattle. In 1810 he was sent as a servant to another farm at Oneix and there made his First Communion on 9 June 1811 – it was this event that served as the trigger for his religious vocation. He decided that he wanted to become a priest and so returned to his hometown and told his father: "I want to be a priest". His father said it would be impossible due to their poor financial condition (he said: "No! We are too poor") but his maternal grandmother Catherine Etchéverry knew a parish priest and convinced him to enroll him at school for studies before he became a seminarian. He attended school at Saint-Palais where he studied Latin and French in the candlelight late into the night while paid his expenses through working for priests and in the local bishop's kitchen – the cook there had a disliking for him for unknown reasons. The parish priest Jean Baptiste Borda gave him private lessons. Garicoïts commenced his studies for the priesthood in Aire-sur-Adour and later in Dax. He was asked to teach seminarians at Larressore despite still being a student himself. He received his ordination to the priesthood on 20 December 1823 at the Bayonne Cathedral from Archbishop – future cardinal – Paul-Thérèse-David d'Astros.

He was appointed as the curate to the town of Cambo not too far from where he was ordained and he was there from the beginning of 1824 until late 1825 when he was sent to Bétharram to teach philosophical studies. In 1833 the diocesan bishop ceased education for seminarians in that place for unknown reasons and he was left to care for that Marian shrine and its pilgrims. It dawned on him to begin his own religious congregation for all priests and professed brothers and dedicated it to the Sacred Heart as a means of evangelizing to people through missions. Before he founded it he attended a month retreat with the Jesuits in 1832 for guidance and his spiritual director Father Le Blanc helped to guide him along the right path. Garicoïts helped Jean Elizabeth Bichier des Ages found her religious order while later establishing his own in 1838.

He died in the morning about 3:00am in mid-1863 due to an apoplexy. He had suffered from poor health since 1853 and in 1859 was quite ill but rallied from this until Lent in 1863 when his condition deteriorated to the point where he knew his death was near. His final words in a low murmur were: "Have pity on me, Lord, in Your great mercy".

=== Name ===
His Basque surname is the origin of the male name "Garikoitz".

In the Basque Country his name would have been spelt "Mitxel".

== Sainthood ==
The sainthood process commenced under Pope Leo XIII on 15 May 1899 and Garicoïts was titled as a Servant of God. Pope Benedict XV confirmed that the late priest had lived a model life of heroic virtue and named him as Venerable on 10 December 1916 as a result. Two miracles approved allowed for Pope Pius XI to preside over his beatification on 10 May 1923 while a decree resumed the cause on 23 July 1924.

Two additional miracles were investigated and received the validation of the Congregation for Rites on 17 July 1929. A preparatory committee approved them both on 13 April 1943 as did a general committee on 15 February 1944 and Pope Pius XII on 27 February 1944 who confirmed his sainthood. Pius XII proclaimed Garicoïts to be a saint of the Roman Catholic Church on 6 July 1947.

== Churches named in his honour ==
- Church of St. Michel Garicoïts, Chiang Dao, Chiang Mai province, Thailand
- San Miguel Garicoits, Montevideo, Uruguay
