= San José y San Maximiliano Kolbe, Montevideo =

Roman Catholic parish church in Montevideo, Uruguay

Coordinates: 34°54′32″S 56°11′27.3″W

Iglesia de San José y San Maximiliano Kolbe (Conventuales)
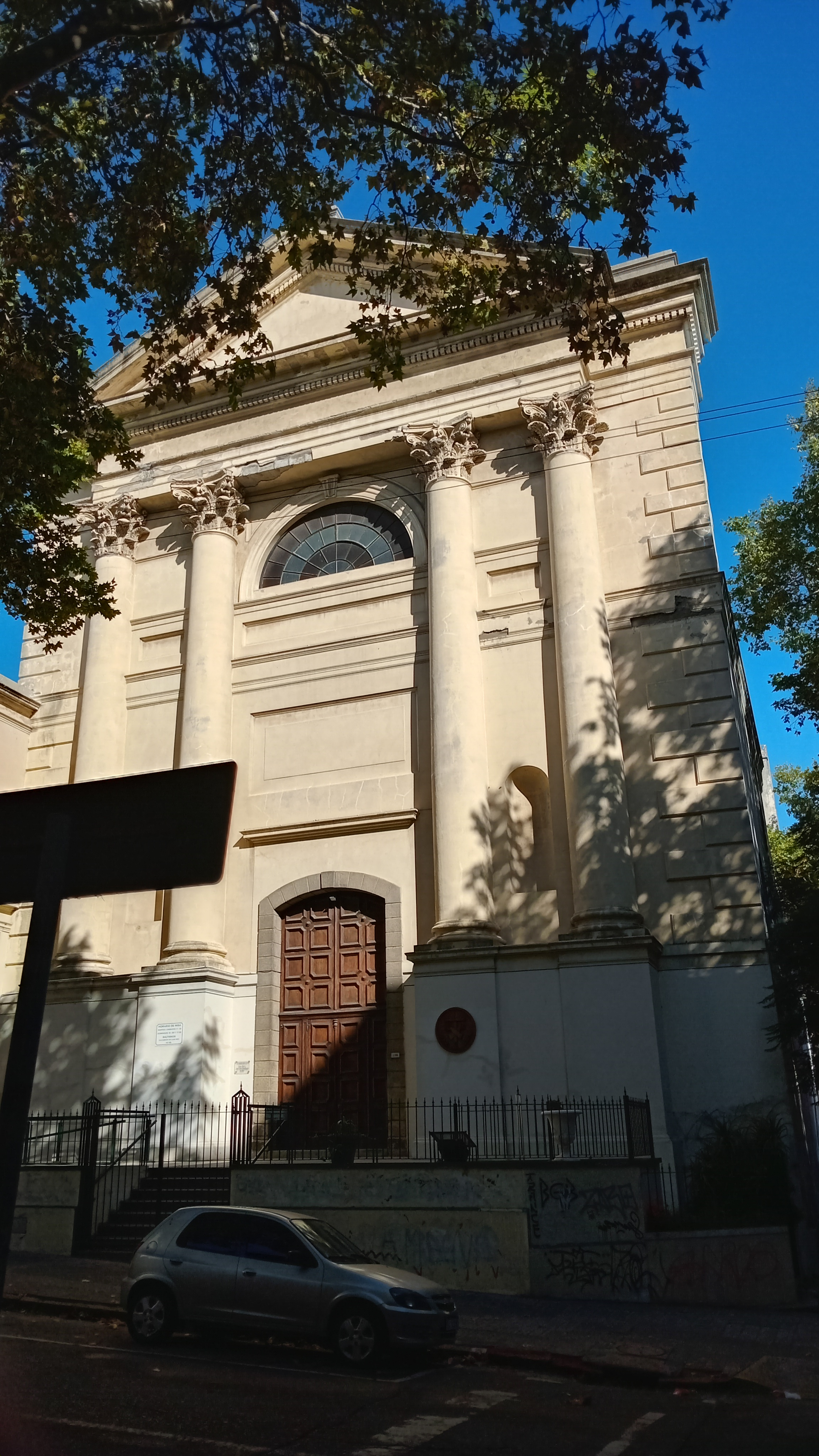

Religion
- Affiliation: Roman Catholic
- Ecclesiastical or organizational status: Parish church
- Year consecrated: 1867

Location
- Location: Canelones 1156; Montevideo, Uruguay
- Interactive map of Iglesia de San José y San Maximiliano Kolbe (Conventuales)

Architecture
- Architect: Víctor Rabú
- Type: Church
- Style: Neo-Renaissance, Neo-Baroque
- Direction of façade: North

The Church of Saint Joseph and Saint Maximilian Kolbe (Spanish: Iglesia de San José y San Maximiliano Kolbe), popularly known as Iglesia de los Conventuales (due to its history as a former claustration convent), is a Roman Catholic parish church in Montevideo, Uruguay.

== History ==
The temple and its convent were built by French architect Víctor Rabú between 1860 and 1867 for the Order of the Visitation of Holy Mary, whose nuns lived in claustration. The architectural inspiration, mix of Renaissance and Baroque, was taken from the Italian Basilica of Sant'Andrea, Mantua.

For some time the remains of the patriot priest Dámaso Antonio Larrañaga were held here, before being brought to the cathedral.

The parish was established much later, on 17 February 1966.

Today it is held by the Conventual Franciscans. It is dedicated to Saint Joseph; later it was also dedicated to the Polish martyr St. Maximilian Kolbe, O.F.M. Conv.
