= Soneira Castle =

Coordinates: 34.858730°S 56.196555°W

- Castillo Soneira
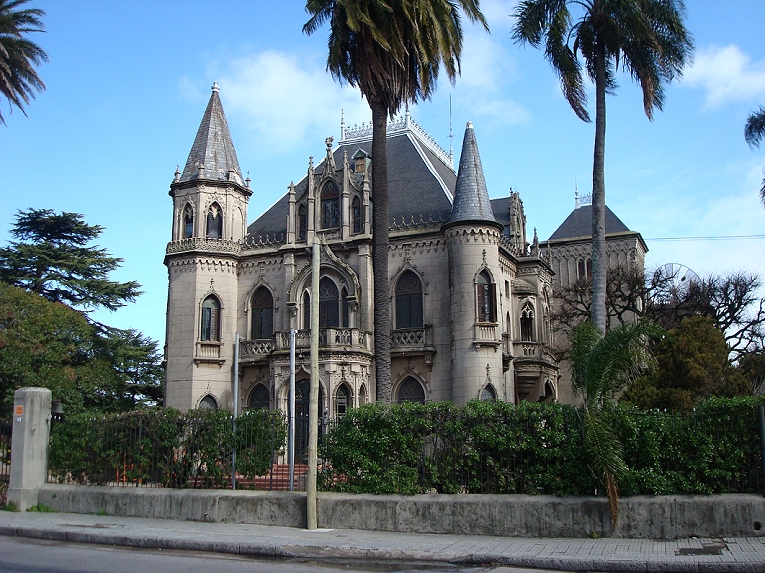
- Interactive map of the Soneira Castle area
- Alternative names: Casa Quinta Soneira

General information
- Status: Completed
- Type: Housing; Office building
- Architectural style: Gothic Revival architecture
- Location: Montevideo, Uruguay
- Construction started: 1861
- Completed: 1871
- Renovated: 1912

Design and construction
- Architect: Víctor Rabú

Renovating team
- Architect: Camille Gardelle

The Soneira Castle (Spanish: Castillo Soneira) is a neo-Gothic building located in the Prado neighborhood of Montevideo, Uruguay. Constructed in the 1860s by French architect Victor Rabu, it was designated a National Historic Monument in 1999.

== History ==
Soneira Castle was commissioned by Dorotea Peláez Villademoros, the widow of Francisco Antonio Soneira y Aguiar, a Galician-born merchant who settled in Uruguay in 1810 and died in 1835, leaving only one son. In the aftermath of the Uruguayan Civil War, during the 1860s, the Prado area began to emerge as a popular countryside retreat for the country’s elite. Within this context, Dorotea hired French architect Victor Rabu to design a two-story residence that would serve as the new home for the Soneira family.

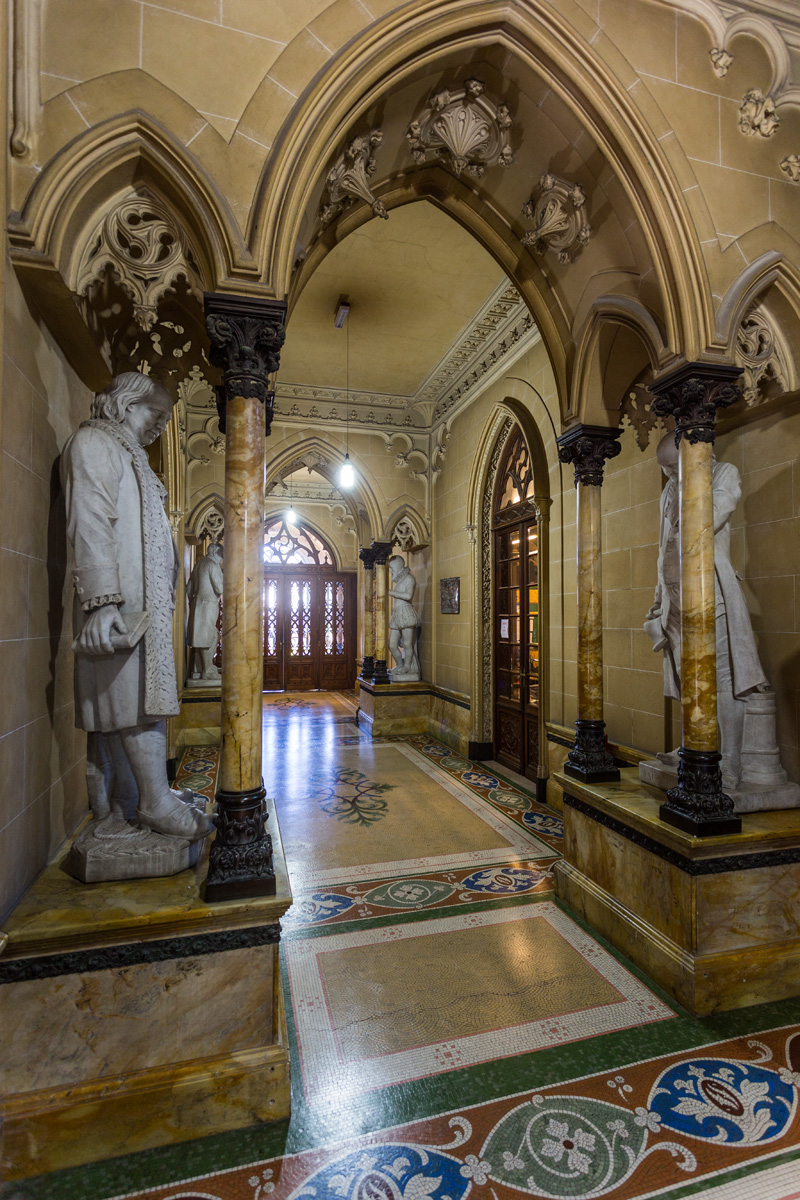
Castle's main corridor

The basement level housed the service quarters and kitchen, while the attic was home to the art studio of painter Federico Soneira Villademoros, son of the original owners. The castle underwent major renovations between 1912 and 1914, led by architect Camille Gardelle. Inside, the moldings, stained glass, and marquetry flooring were refurbished, while the exterior saw the redesign of the main façade and the addition of a tennis court, swimming pool, and stables.

In 2009, Lutheran Colegio San Pablo acquired the property for one million US dollars, intending to use it for high school and pre-university courses.
