= Plaza de Cagancha =

- Plaza
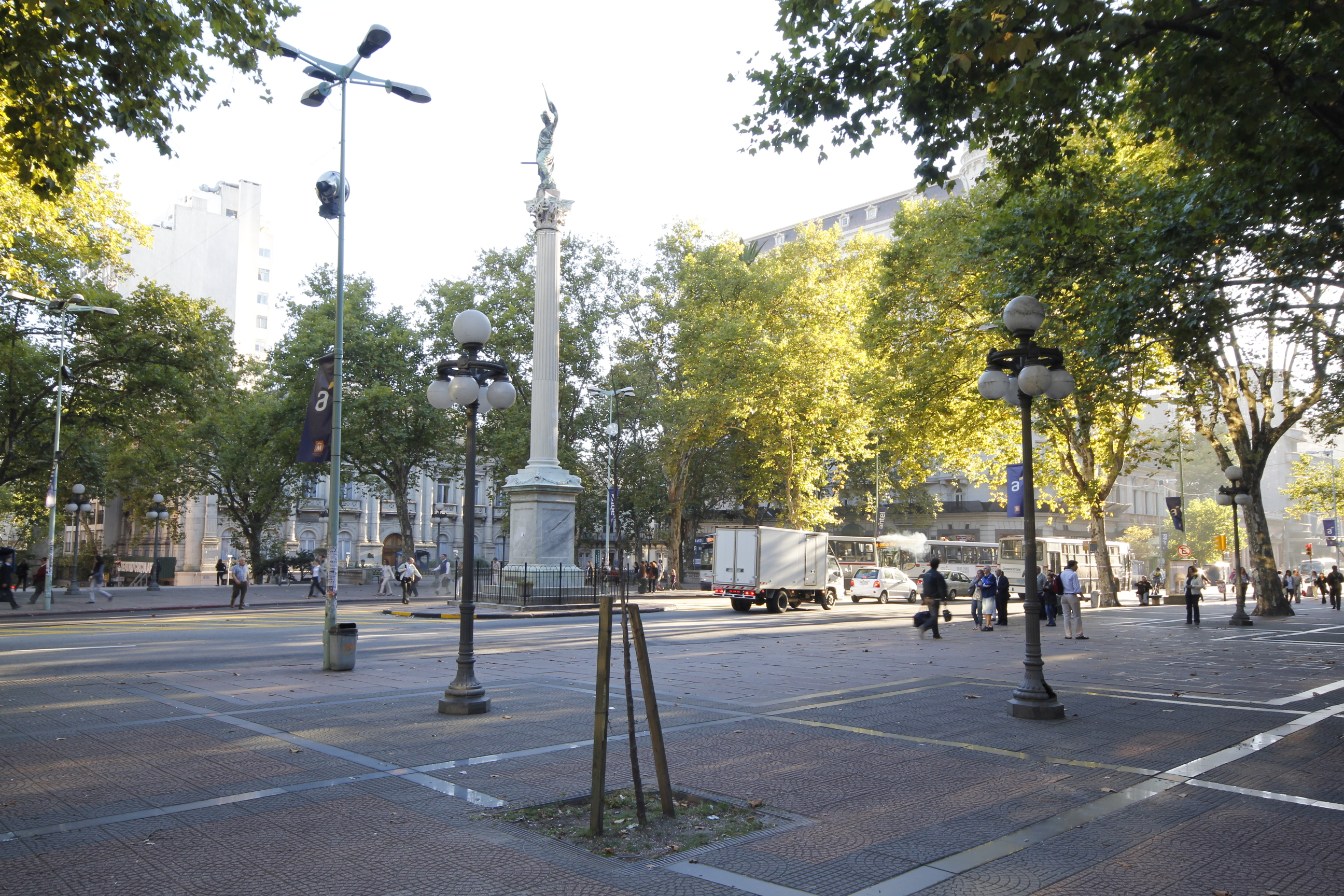

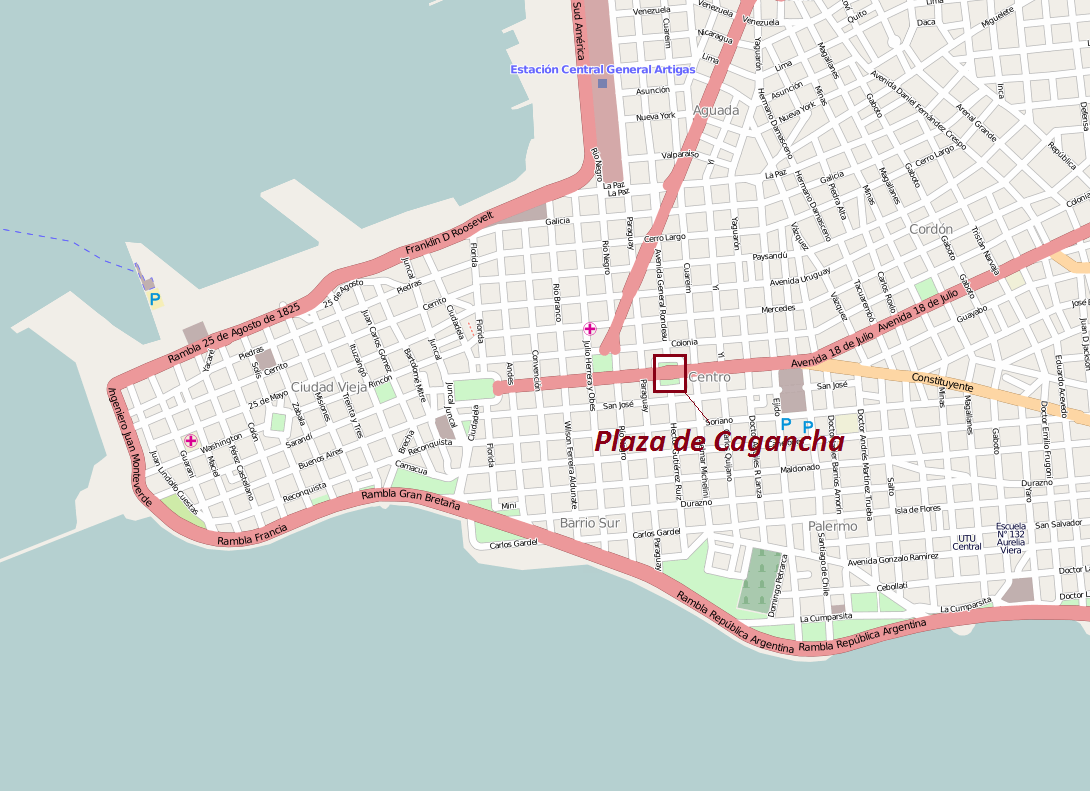
- Coordinates: 34°54′21″S 56°11′29″W
- Country: Uruguay
- Department: Montevideo Department
- City: Montevideo
- Barrio: Centro

Plaza de Cagancha (Spanish for 'Cagancha Square') is a public square in the Centro neighborhood of Montevideo, Uruguay. Located on 18 de Julio Avenue, the main avenue of the city, it originated in 1836 as the central space of the layout of the "Ciudad Nueva" ("New City"), outside the limits of the walled area of the colonial period.

It is surrounded by several notable buildings such as the Palacio Piria, seat of the Supreme Court, and the Ateneo de Montevideo.

== History ==
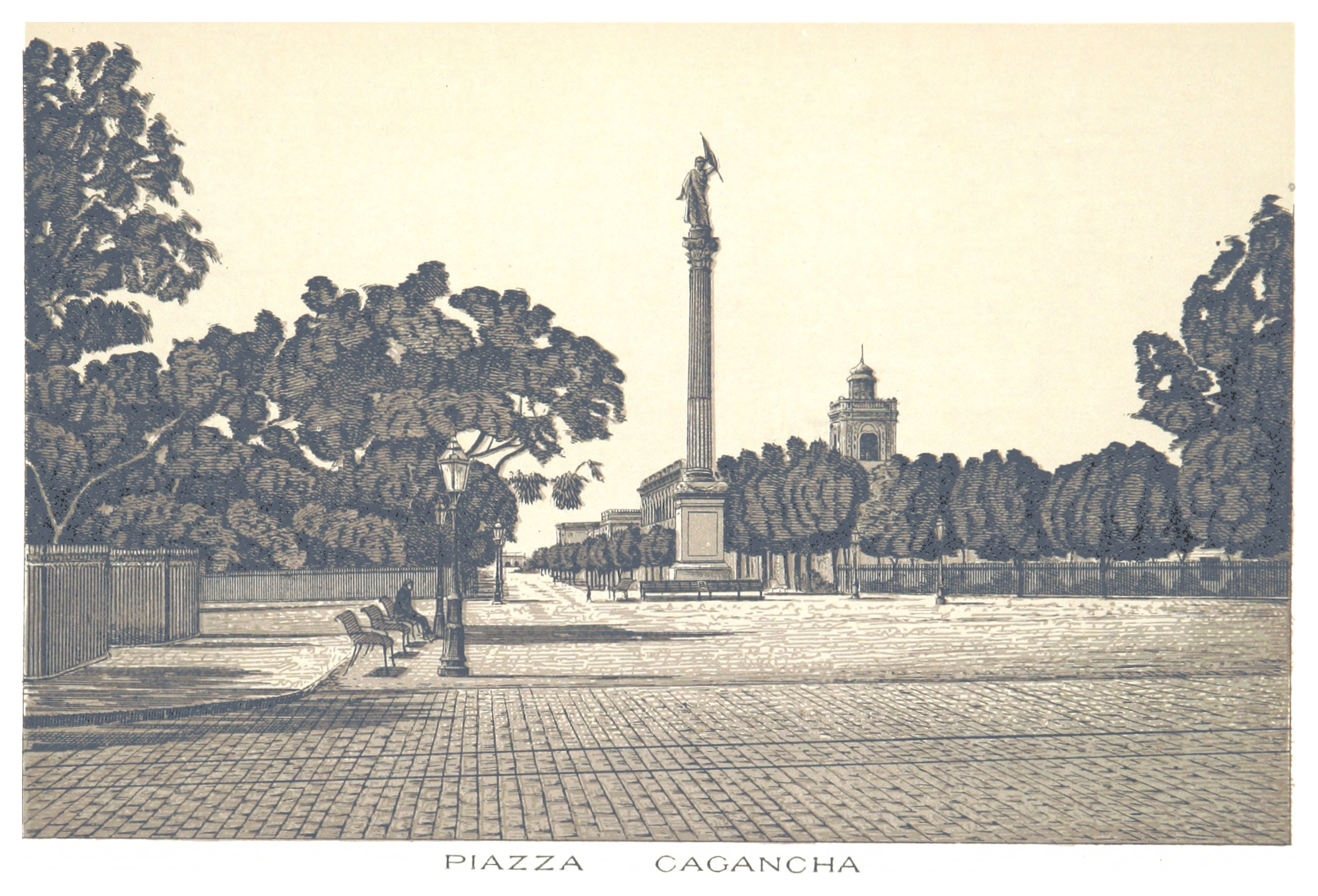
Illustration of Plaza Cagancha in 1885

In 1829, four years after the Independence of Uruguay, it was decided to pull down the fortifications of the Old City and extend the city to form the "Ciudad Nueva" ("New City"), centered on 18 de Julio Avenue. In 1836 the current square was founded, which was the nerve center of the layout of the new city. On February 7, 1840, by a decree, the space was named "Plaza Cagancha", in commemoration of the victory of General Fructuoso Rivera against Pascual Echagüe from Entre Ríos in 1839, on the banks of the Cagancha stream, in the homonymous battle framed in the Uruguayan Civil War.

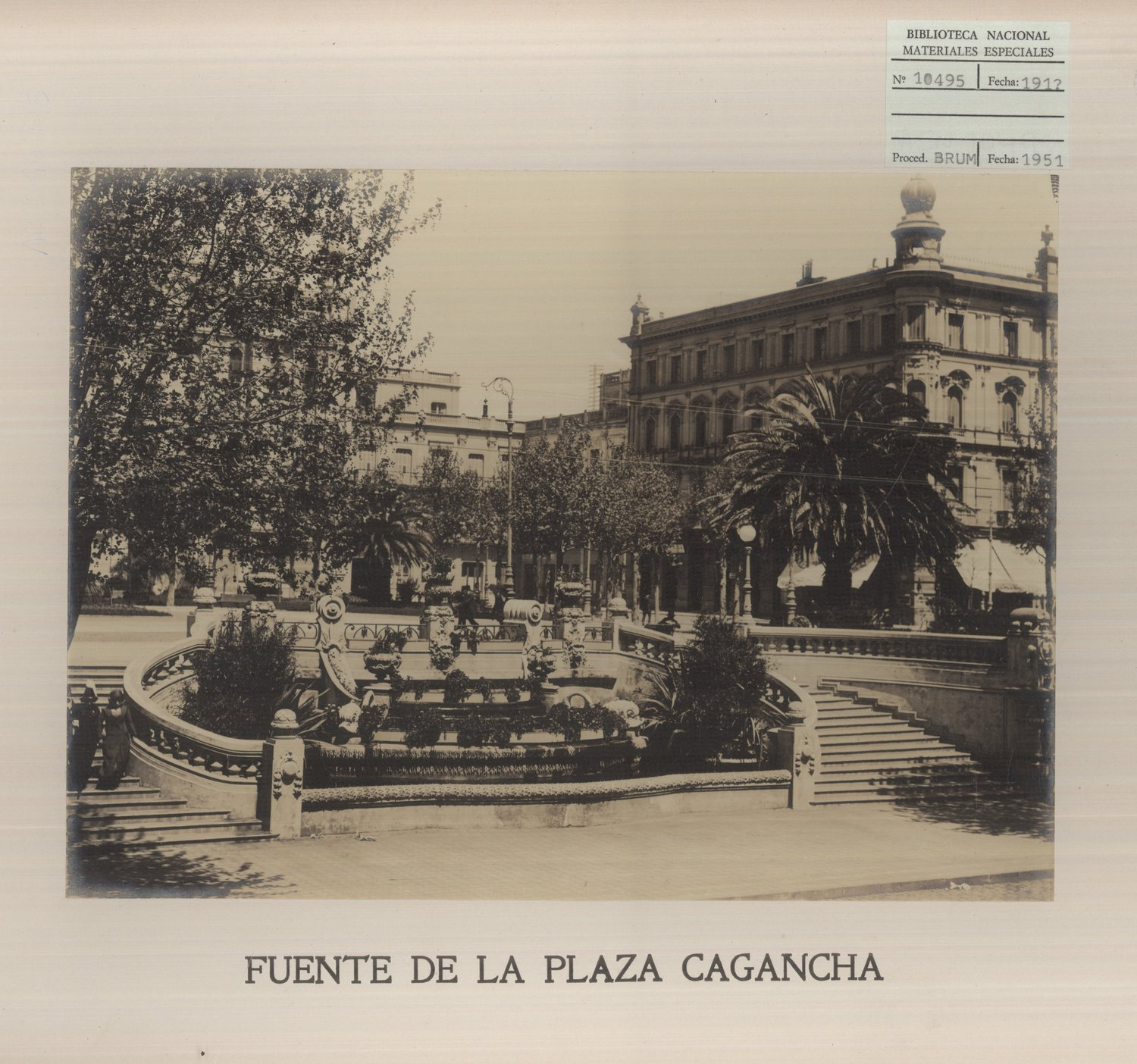
Fountain in the square in 1910

In 1867, a monument of 17 meters and 9 tons was inaugurated in the center of the square, the Column of Peace (Statue of Peace), which honors the peace that ended a civil war between the "traditional parties" —the National and the Colorado— two years earlier. The monument is made up of an allegorical female figure, which crowns a tall white marble column. The bronze statue has in its right hand a Roman gladius, which was replaced in 1889 by chains with a broken ring and link, symbolizing freedom. The Column of Peace marks the Kilometre zero for the National Routes of Uruguay.

From 1890 to 1930, the public lighting system and the new urbanization made the square a popular promenade in the city. Also, during this time, flowerbeds and steps were added. At the beginning of the 20th century, the French landscape architect Carlos Thays undertook the embellishment of this square.

== Surroundings ==
Around the square, several important buildings for the country are located. On the south side, in the Human Rights Passage, stands the Palacio Piria, headquarters of the Supreme Court. Opposite the square stands the Palacio de los Tribunales, a building that formerly served as the headquarters of the ONDA transport company.

In the southwest corner was the Jackson Palace, an Italian Renaissance-style building built in 1891 by the German architects Parcus and Siegerist, which had been commissioned by businessman Emilio Reus and continued by Juan D. Jackson. The building had 4 floors, and had the first elevator that was installed in Montevideo. It was the seat of the Municipality of Montevideo and of the Montevideo Administration Councils from the end of the 19th century until 1941. It was demolished in 1979, and currently a modern office building stands in its place, with commercial premises on the ground floor on 18 de Julio Avenue.

On the north side of the square stands the Sorocabana Building, whose ground floor housed a popular café of the same name for several decades, as well as the Cine Teatro Plaza, the Ateneo de Montevideo, the José Pedro Varela Pedagogical Museum and the Circular Theater. On the northwest side, the Mercado de los Artesanos, a Uruguayan association of artisans, has been located since 1983.

North side
Palacio Montero	Ateneo de Montevideo	José Pedro Varela Pedagogical Museum	Teatro Circular
Column of Peace
Supreme Court	Palacio de los Tribunales	El País newspaper headquarters	Mercado de los Artesanos
South side

== Gallery ==
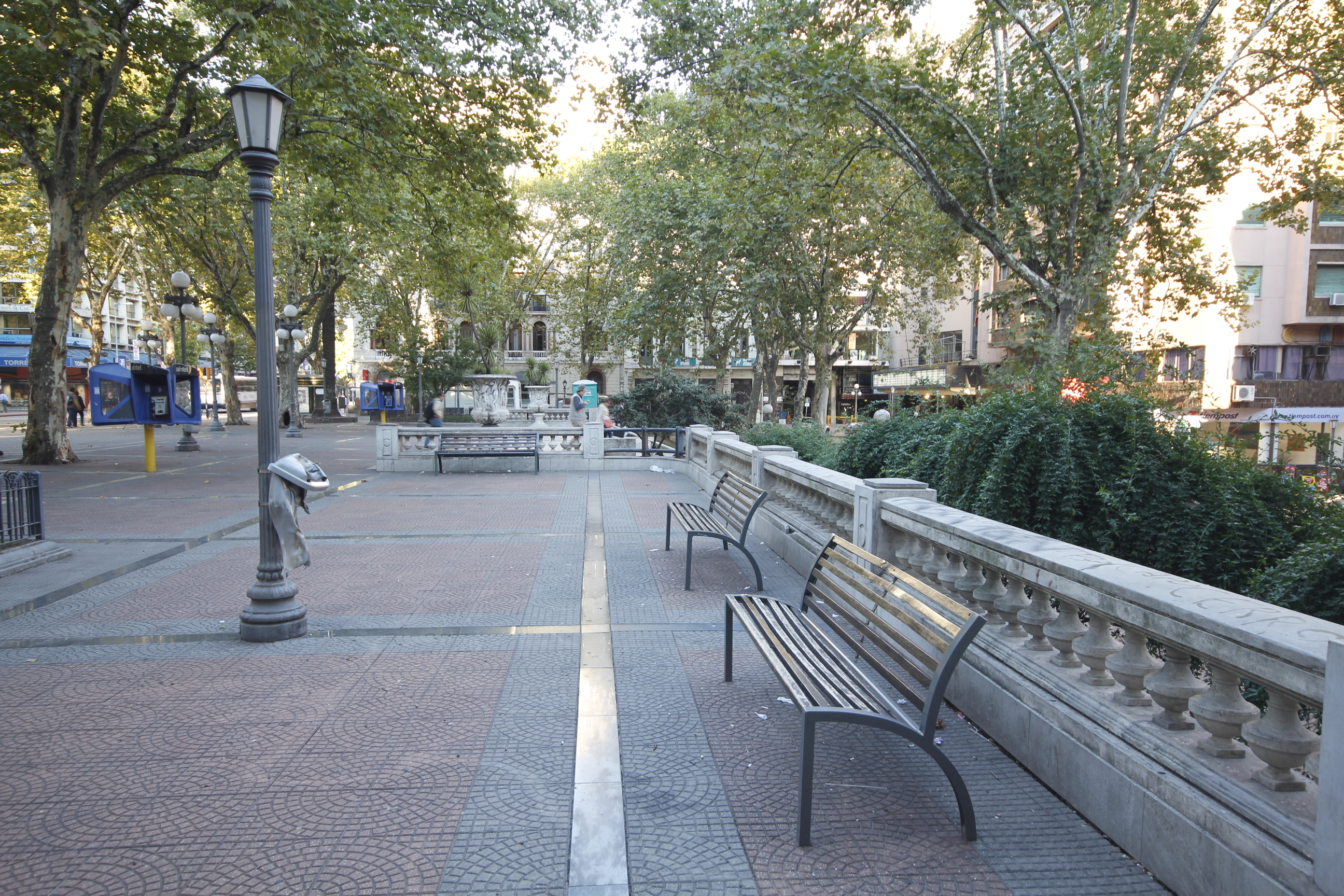
Promenade of the Gardens on the north side, next to the start of Rondeau St.

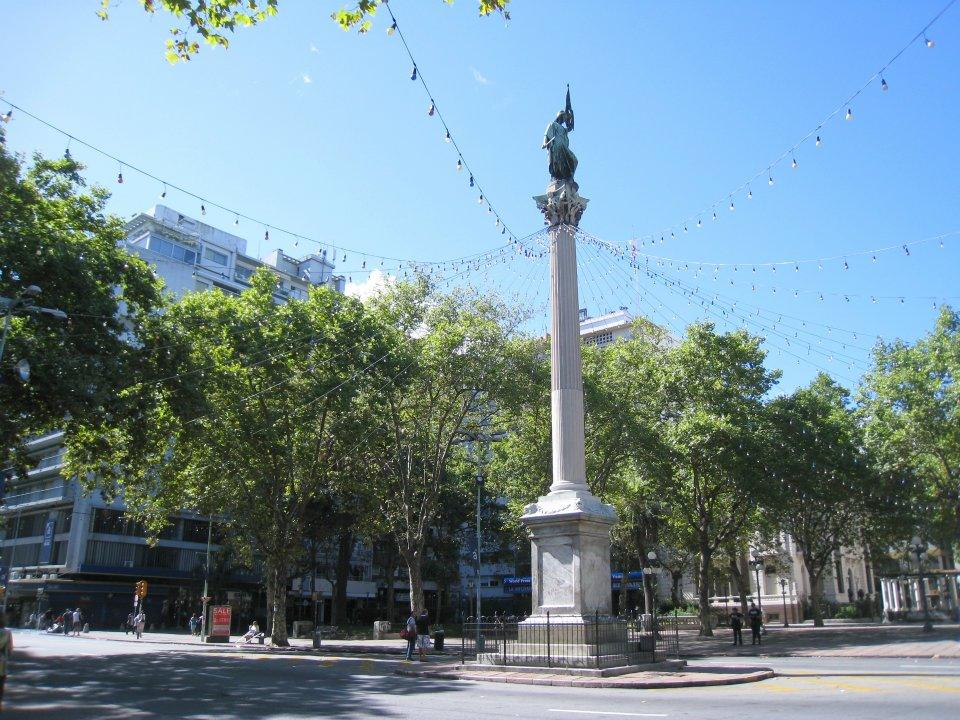
Column of peace

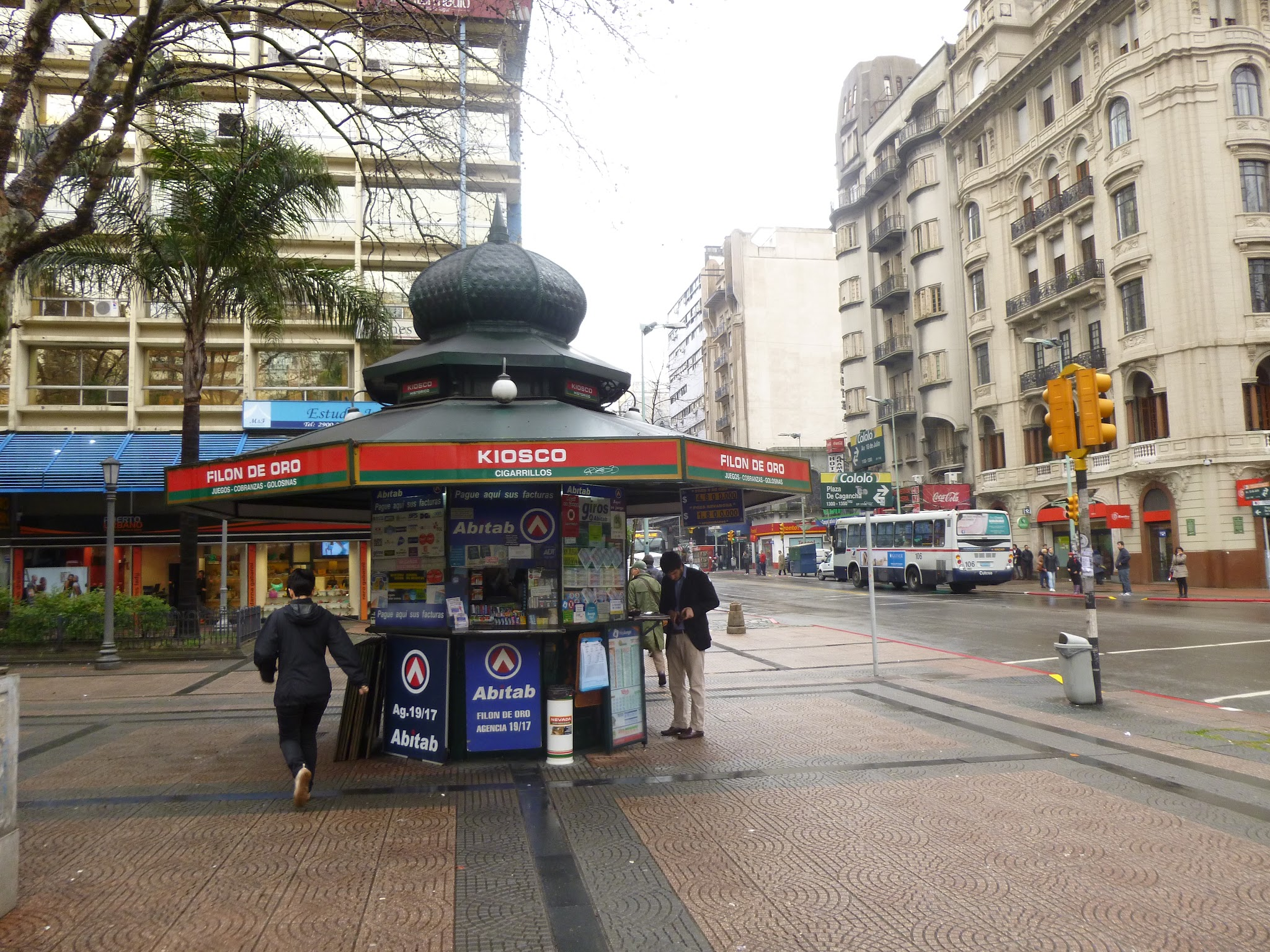
Kiosk in a corner of the square

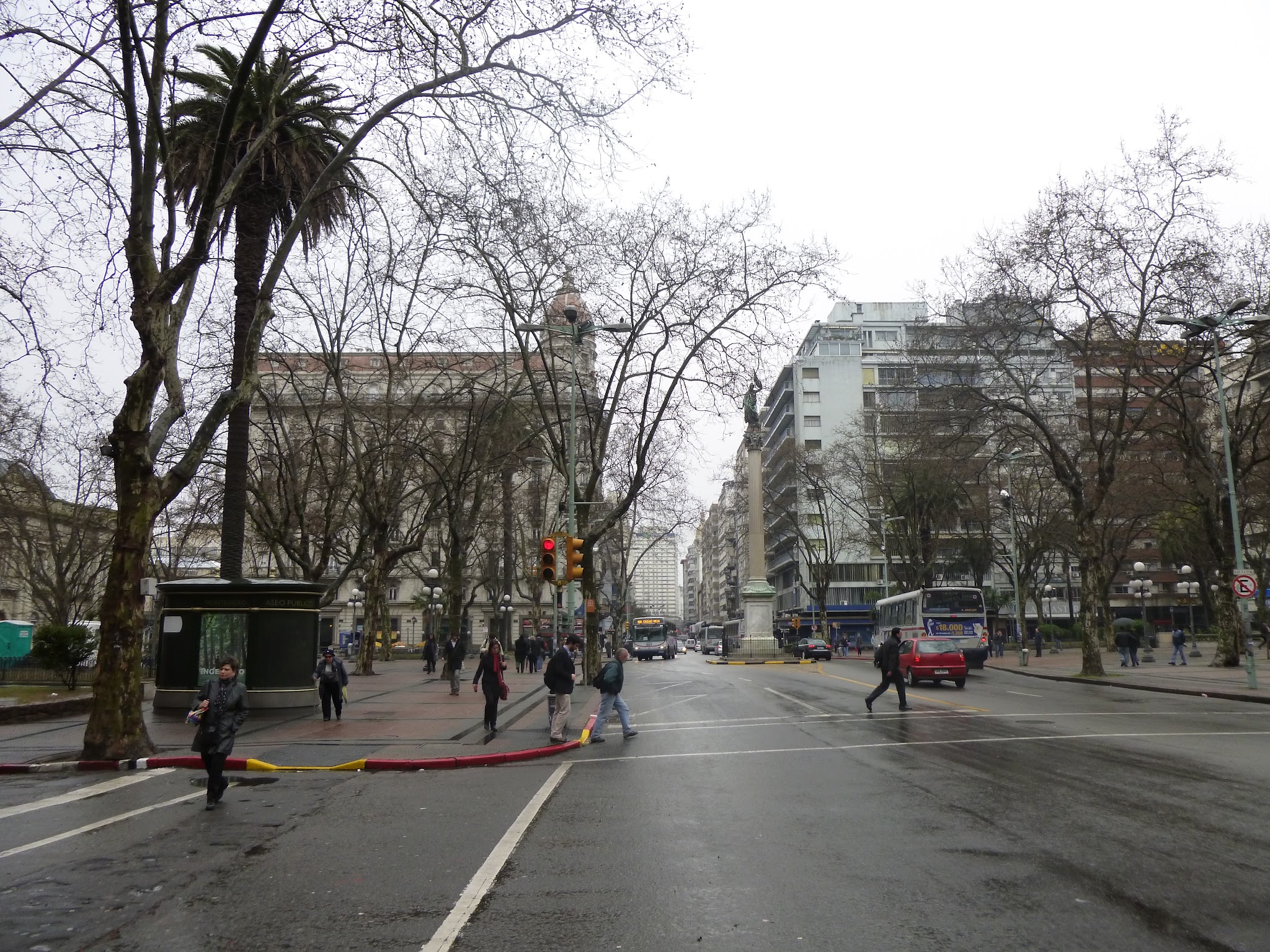
18 de Julio Avenue
