= Saint-Just-Ibarre =

Saint-Just-Ibarre Donaixti-Ibarre (Basque)
- Commune
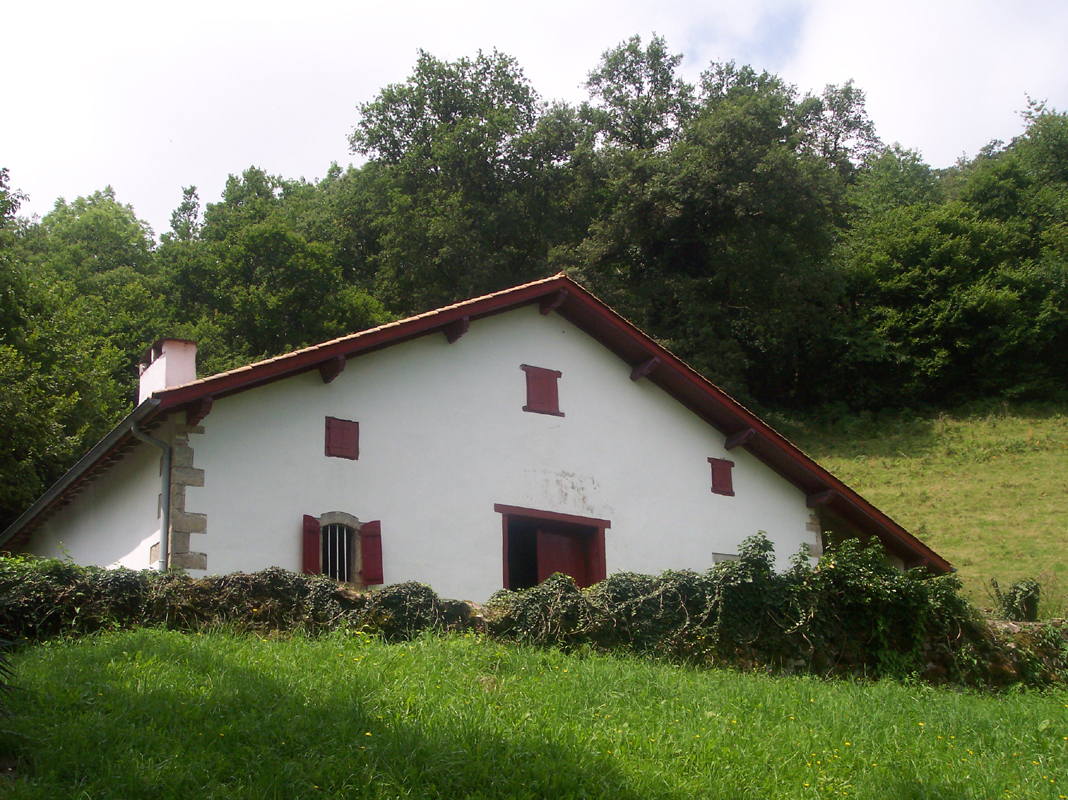
- The birthplace of Michel Garicoïts in Ibarre

- Coat of arms
- Location of Saint-Just-Ibarre
- Location within France Location within Nouvelle-Aquitaine
- Coordinates: 43°11′43″N 1°03′19″W
- Country: France
- Region: Nouvelle-Aquitaine
- Department: Pyrénées-Atlantiques
- Arrondissement: Bayonne
- Canton: Pays de Bidache, Amikuze et Ostibarre
- Intercommunality: CA Pays Basque

Government
  - Mayor (2020–2026): André Larralde
- Area^{1}: 30.03 km^{2} (11.59 sq mi)
- Elevation: 435 m (1,427 ft)
- Highest elevation: 1,179 m (3,868 ft)
- Lowest elevation: 172 m (564 ft)
- Population (2023): 197
  - Density: 6.56/km^{2} (17.0/sq mi)
- Time zone: UTC+01:00 (CET)
  - Summer (DST): UTC+02:00 (CEST)
- INSEE/Postal code: 64487 /64120
- ^{1} French Land Register data, which excludes lakes, ponds, glaciers > 1 km^{2} (0.386 sq mi or 247 acres) and river estuaries.

Saint-Just-Ibarre (French pronunciation: [sɛ̃ ʒy(st) ibaʁ]; Occitan: Sent Just-Ibarra; Basque: Donaixti-Ibarre) is a commune in the Pyrénées-Atlantiques department in south-western France.

It is located in the former province of Lower Navarre.

== See also ==
- Communes of the Pyrénées-Atlantiques department
