= Parroquia San Francisco de Asís, Montevideo =

Coordinates: 34.906°S 56.209°W

Parroquia San Francisco de Asís
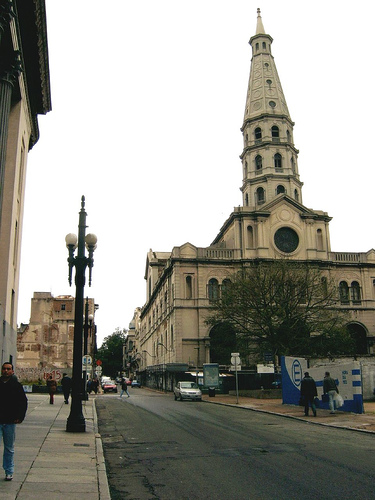

Religion
- Affiliation: Roman Catholic
- Ecclesiastical or organizational status: Parish church

Location
- Location: Montevideo, Uruguay
- Interactive map of Parroquia San Francisco de Asís

Architecture
- Architect: Víctor Rabú
- Type: Church
- Style: Neo-Romanesque
- Direction of façade: North

The Parish Church of St. Francis of Assisi (Spanish: Parroquia San Francisco de Asís) is a Roman Catholic parish church in Montevideo, Uruguay.

== Overview ==
Dedicated to St. Francis of Assisi, the church was originally established 2 December 1840.

Located at the intersection of the streets Cerrito and Solís of the Ciudad Vieja, it was built in the 19th century in Neo-Romanesque style by French-Uruguayan architect Victor Rabu, who was inspired by the basilica of St. Sernin, Toulouse; the building was completed in 1870.

== Bibliography ==
- César J. Loustau (1995-01-01). Influence of France in the architecture of Uruguay. Ediciones Trilce. p. 146. ISBN 9974-32-116-6.
- Guía Arquitectónica y Urbanística de Montevideo. 3rd edition. Intendencia Municipal de Montevideo, 2008, ISBN 978-9974-600-26-3, pages 50, 132.

== See also ==
- List of Catholic churches in Uruguay
