= Departmental Council of Pyrénées-Atlantiques =

Departmental legislature in France

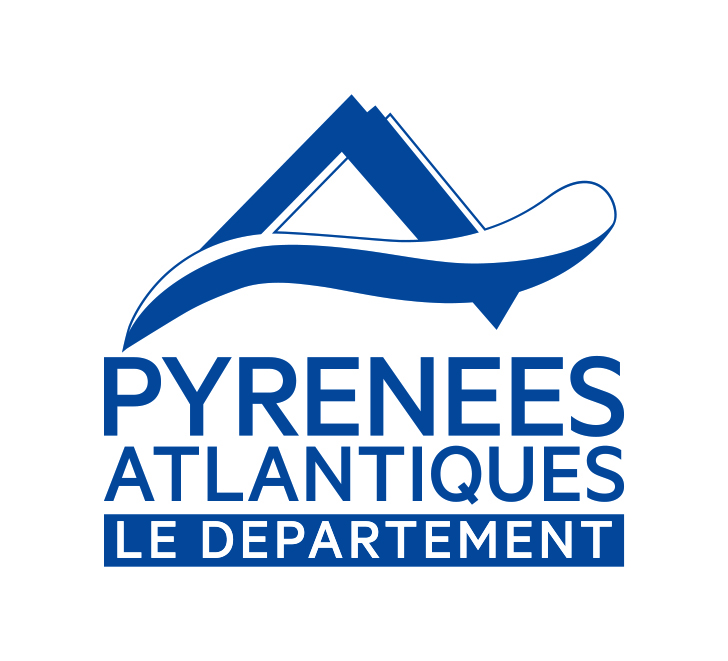

The Departmental Council of Pyrénées-Atlantiques (French: Conseil Départemental des Pyrénées-Atlantiques, Occitan: Conselh departamental dès Pirenèus Atlantics) is the deliberative assembly of the Pyrénées-Atlantiques department in the region of Nouvelle-Aquitaine. It consists of 54 members (general councilors) from 27 cantons. Until the 2015 French departmental elections, it was known as the General Council (French: Conseil général).

The President of the Departmental Council is Jean-Jacques Lasserre (MoDem).

== Vice-Presidents ==
The President of the Departmental Council is assisted by 12 vice-presidents chosen from among the departmental advisers. Each of them has a delegation of authority.

List of vice-presidents of the Pyrénées-Atlantiques Departmental Council (as of 2021)
Order	Name	Party	Canton	Delegation
1st	Claude Olive	LR	Bayonne-1	Autonomy, housing policy and housing
2nd	Véronique Lipsos-Sallenave	DVC	Pau-4	Finance and general administration, responsible for finance and contractual policies
3rd	Charles Pelanne	DVD	Terres des luys et coteaux du Vic-Bilh	Development, infrastructure and partnerships with local authorities
4th	Isabelle Lahore	DVC	Pays de Morlaàs et du Montanérès	Education, colleges and college life
5th	Nicolas Patriarche	LR	Lescar, gave et terres ru Pont-Long	Digital transformation, inclusion of uses and networks
6th	Anne-Marie Bruthé	UCD	Pays de Bidache, Amikuze et Ostibarre	Human relations and social dialogue
7th	Jean-Pierre Mirande	UC	Montagne Basque	Mountain policies and cross-border cooperations
8th	Sandrine Lafargue	LR	Lescar, gave et terres ru Pont-Long	Environmental transition
9th	Thierry Carrère	DVC	Pays de Morlaàs et du Montanérès	Attractiveness and development of territories
10th	Annick Trounday-Idiart	UC	Montagne Basque	Youth, integration and access to employment
11th	Jacques Pedehontaà	DVD	Orthez et terres des gaves et du sel	Associative, sporting and cultural life
12th	Christine Lauqué	UCD	Bayonne-3	Children and families

== See also ==
- Pyrénées-Atlantiques
- Departmental council (France)
- Departmental Council of Pyrénées-Atlantiques (official website)
