= Palacio Piria =

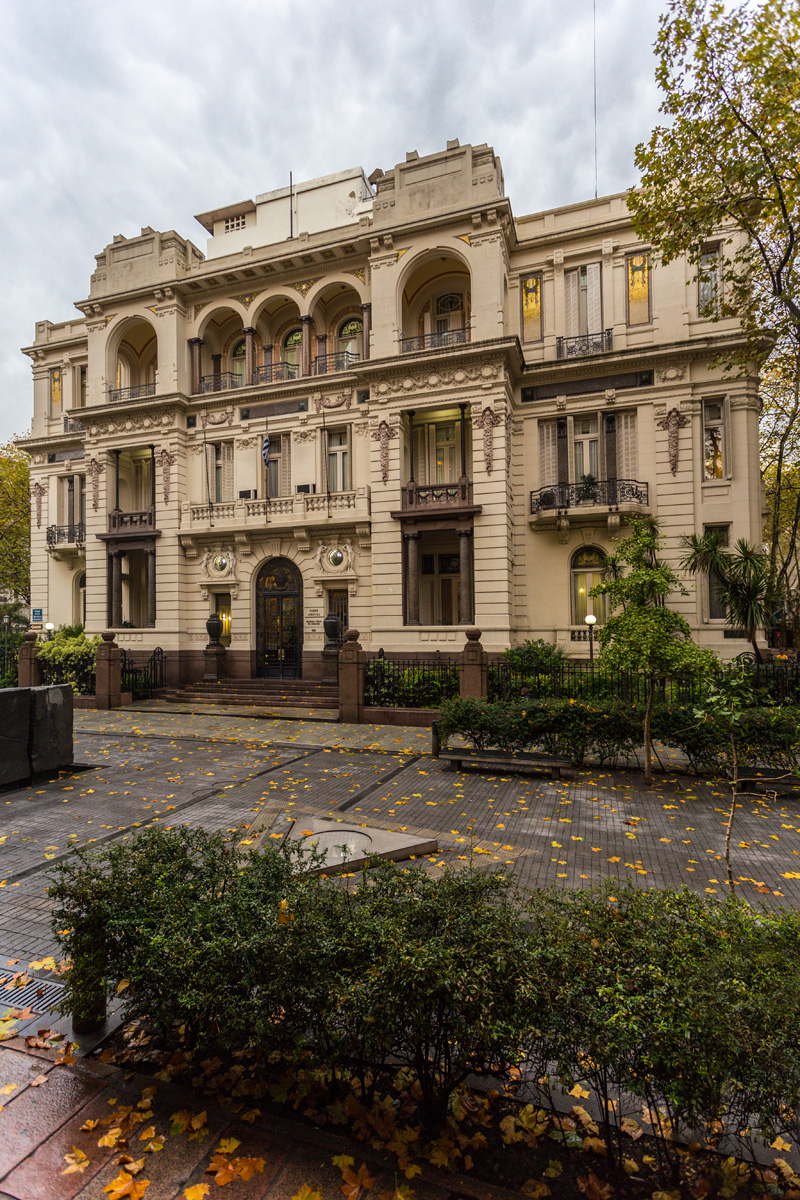
- Palacio Piria, seat of the Supreme Court
- Interactive map of the Palacio Piria area

General information
- Architectural style: Eclecticism
- Location: Pasaje de los Derechos Humanos 1310, Centro, Montevideo (Uruguay)
- Coordinates: 34°54′24″S 56°11′28″W
- Construction started: 1916
- Owner: Government of Uruguay

Technical details
- Floor count: 3

Design and construction
- Architect: Camille Gardelle

The Piria Palace (Spanish: Palacio Piria) is the headquarters of the Supreme Court of Uruguay. Located on the south side of the Plaza de Cagancha in Montevideo, on the Human Rights Passage, it was declared a National Historical Monument in 1975. In front of its main entrance is the Monument to Justice, a work by Rafael Lorente Mourelle.

== History ==
The building was originally constructed by Uruguayan businessman and philanthropist Francisco Piria in 1917 as a family residence. The design was carried out by the French architect Camille Gardelle, a former student of the Beaux-Arts de Paris. Piria resided in the building until his death in 1933.

In 1943, then president-elect Juan José de Amézaga leased the property as his private residence. On January 5, 1954, through Law No. 12,090, the Palacio Piria was acquired by the Uruguayan State, and destined to house the Supreme Court of Justice.

Each year on the occasion of Heritage Day the palace opens its doors to be visited by the public.

== Gallery ==
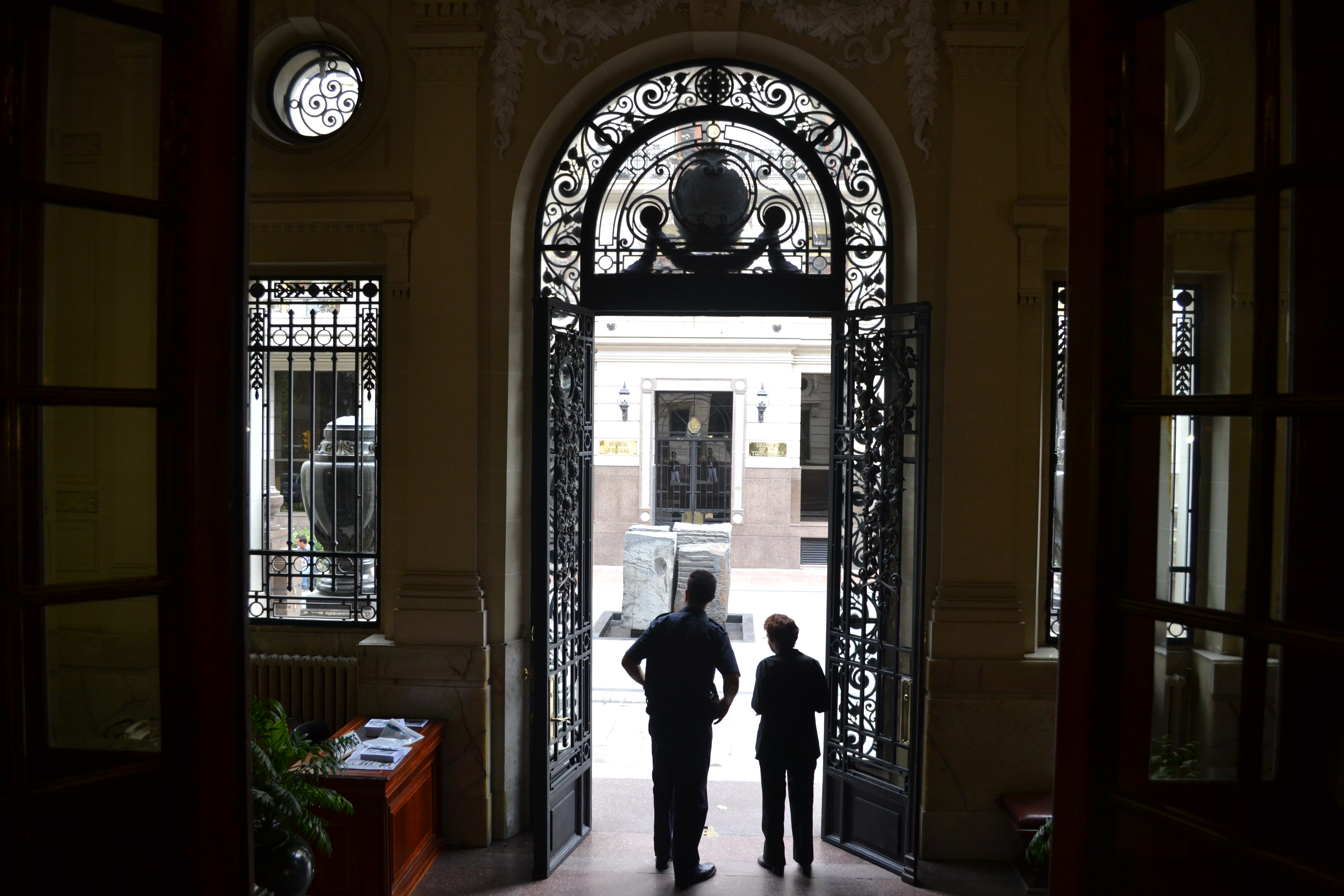
Main entrance from inside

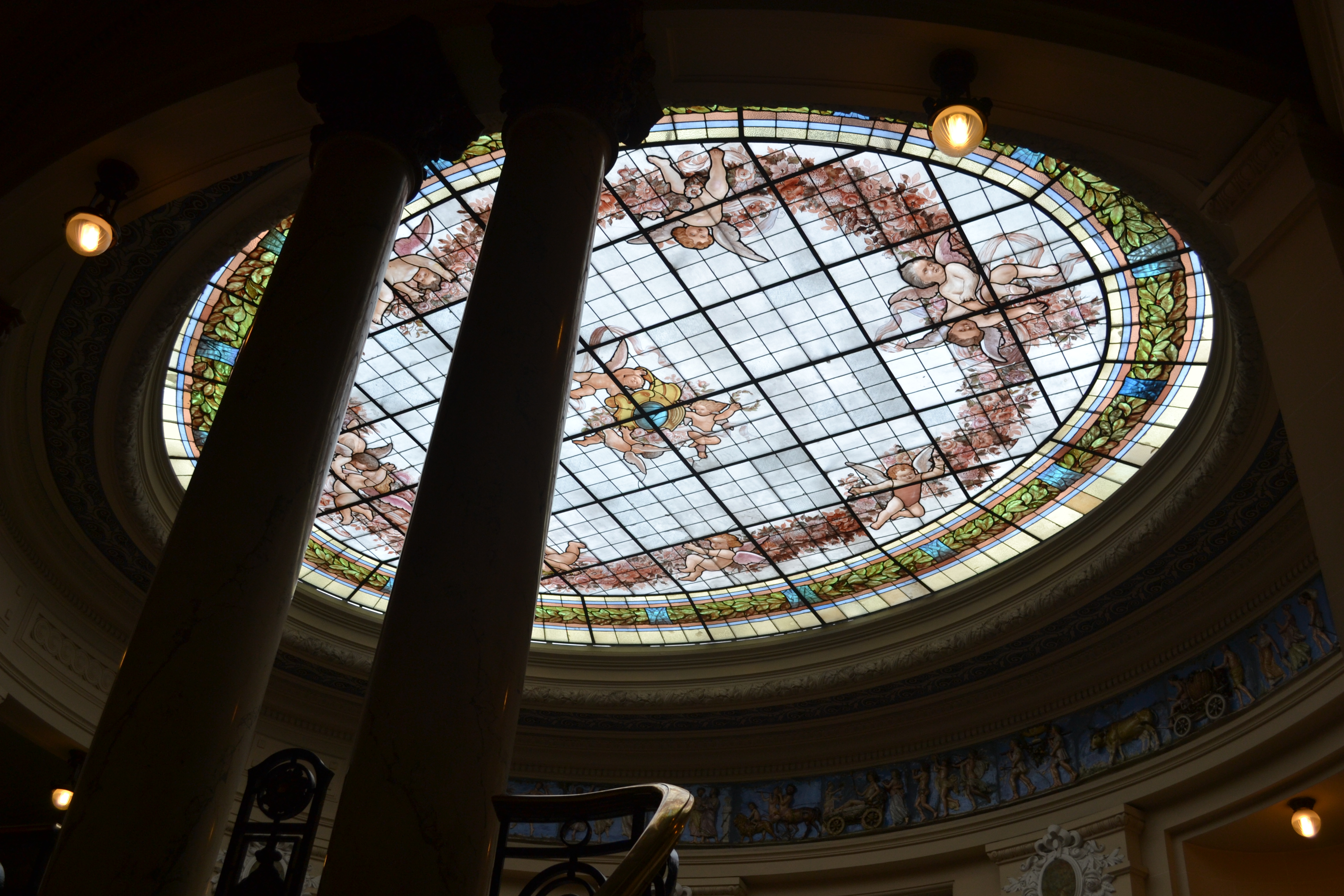
Second floor oval stained glass.

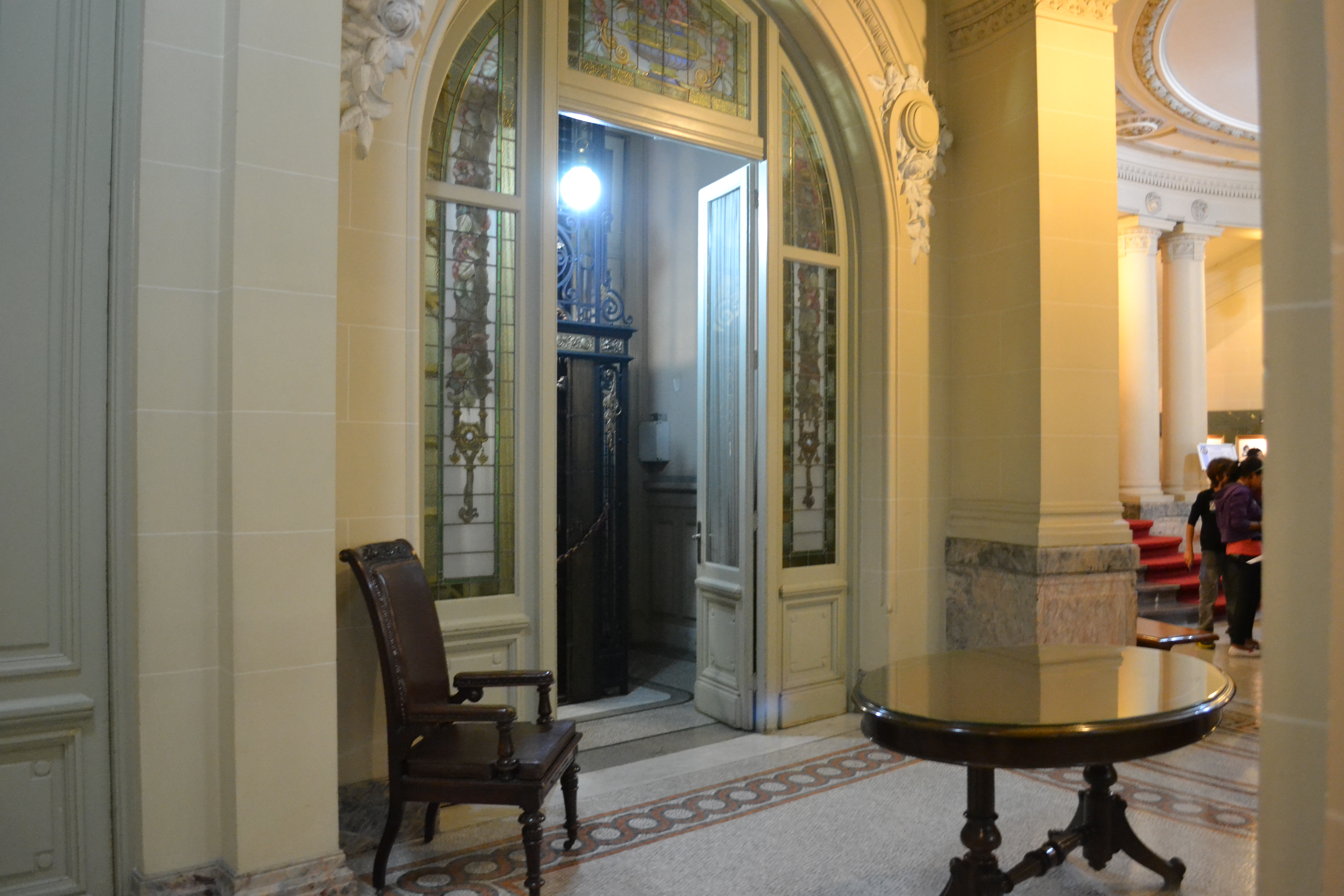
Elevator on the ground floor

== See also ==
- Legislative Palace of Uruguay
- Executive Tower, Montevideo
- Salvo Palace, Montevideo
