= Lestelle-Bétharram =

- Commune
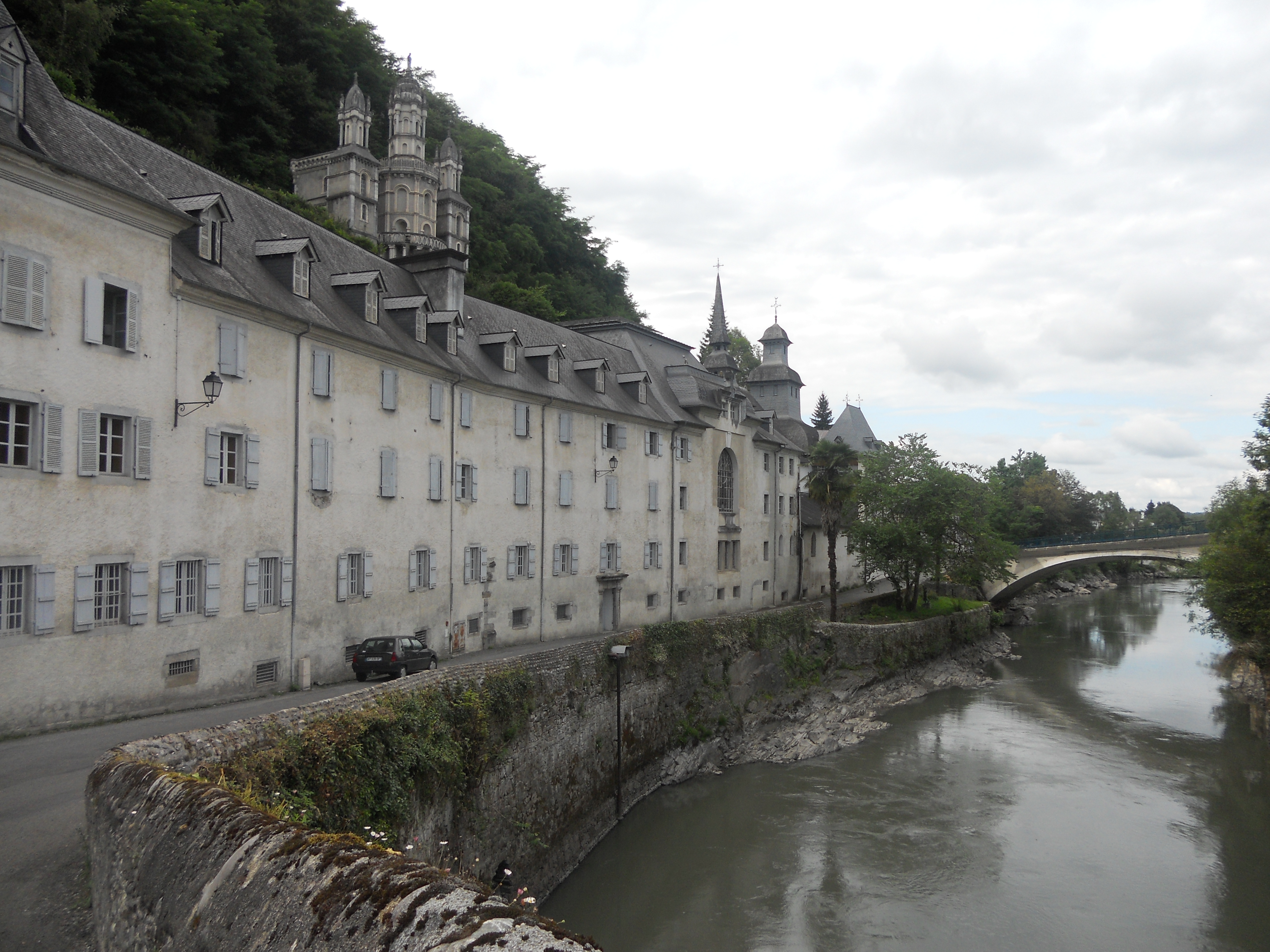
- General view of the sanctuaries of Bétharram

- Coat of arms
- Location of Lestelle-Bétharram
- Location within France Location within Nouvelle-Aquitaine
- Coordinates: 43°07′51″N 0°12′30″W
- Country: France
- Region: Nouvelle-Aquitaine
- Department: Pyrénées-Atlantiques
- Arrondissement: Pau
- Canton: Vallées de l'Ousse et du Lagoin
- Intercommunality: Pays de Nay

Government
  - Mayor (2020–2026): Jean-Marie Berchon
- Area^{1}: 8.63 km^{2} (3.33 sq mi)
- Elevation: 294 m (965 ft)
- Highest elevation: 481 m (1,578 ft)
- Lowest elevation: 278 m (912 ft)
- Population (2023): 788
  - Density: 91.3/km^{2} (236/sq mi)
- Time zone: UTC+01:00 (CET)
  - Summer (DST): UTC+02:00 (CEST)
- INSEE/Postal code: 64339 /64800
- ^{1} French Land Register data, which excludes lakes, ponds, glaciers > 1 km^{2} (0.386 sq mi or 247 acres) and river estuaries.

Lestelle-Bétharram (French pronunciation: [lɛstɛl betaʁam]; Occitan: L'Estela e Bètharram) is a commune in the Pyrénées-Atlantiques department in south-western France.

== History ==
In 1832, St. Michel Garicoits established the Society of Priests of the Sacred Heart of Betharram.

On 5 July 1940, Carl Einstein, German author, activist, and art critic, committed suicide here. An anarchist veteran of the Spanish Civil War, he had been interned in France after the rebel Nationalist victory. Although he had escaped in the turmoil following the German invasion of France, he chose death as the solution to an impossible situation.

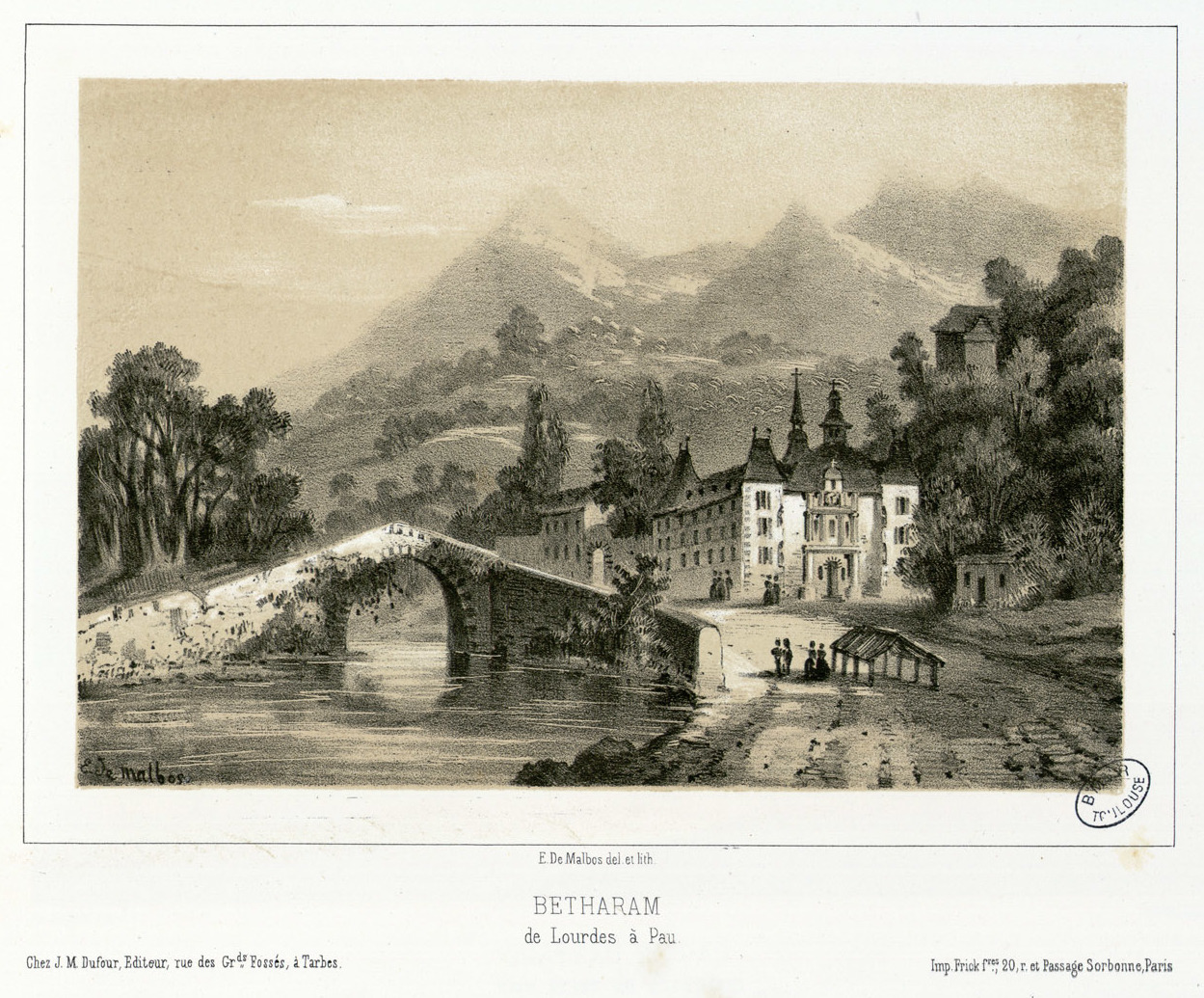
Bétharram near 1840, by Eugène de Malbos.

== See also ==
- Communes of the Pyrénées-Atlantiques department
