= Victor Rabu =

French architect (1834–1907)

Víctor Rabu
- Born: 1834; Agen, Lot-et-Garonne
- Died: 24 March 1907 (aged 72–73); Paris
- Occupation: French architect

Víctor Rabu (1834 – 24 March 1907) was a French architect, active in Uruguay.

== Career ==
He was an exponent of eclectical historicism. He built a notable number of churches in Uruguay, for that reason he was known as "The Lord of the Churches":

- Iglesia de los Conventuales (1867)
- Capilla Jackson (1870)
- Iglesia San Francisco (1870)
- Iglesia de los Vascos (1870)

Some important public buildings were of his authorship, such as the side wings of the Solís Theatre, the Soneira Castle, or the Dámaso Larrañaga Asylum. He also built several private buildings for wealthy families.
