= Ateneo de Montevideo =

Building in Montevideo, Uruguay

Athenæum of Montevideo
- Ateneo de Montevideo
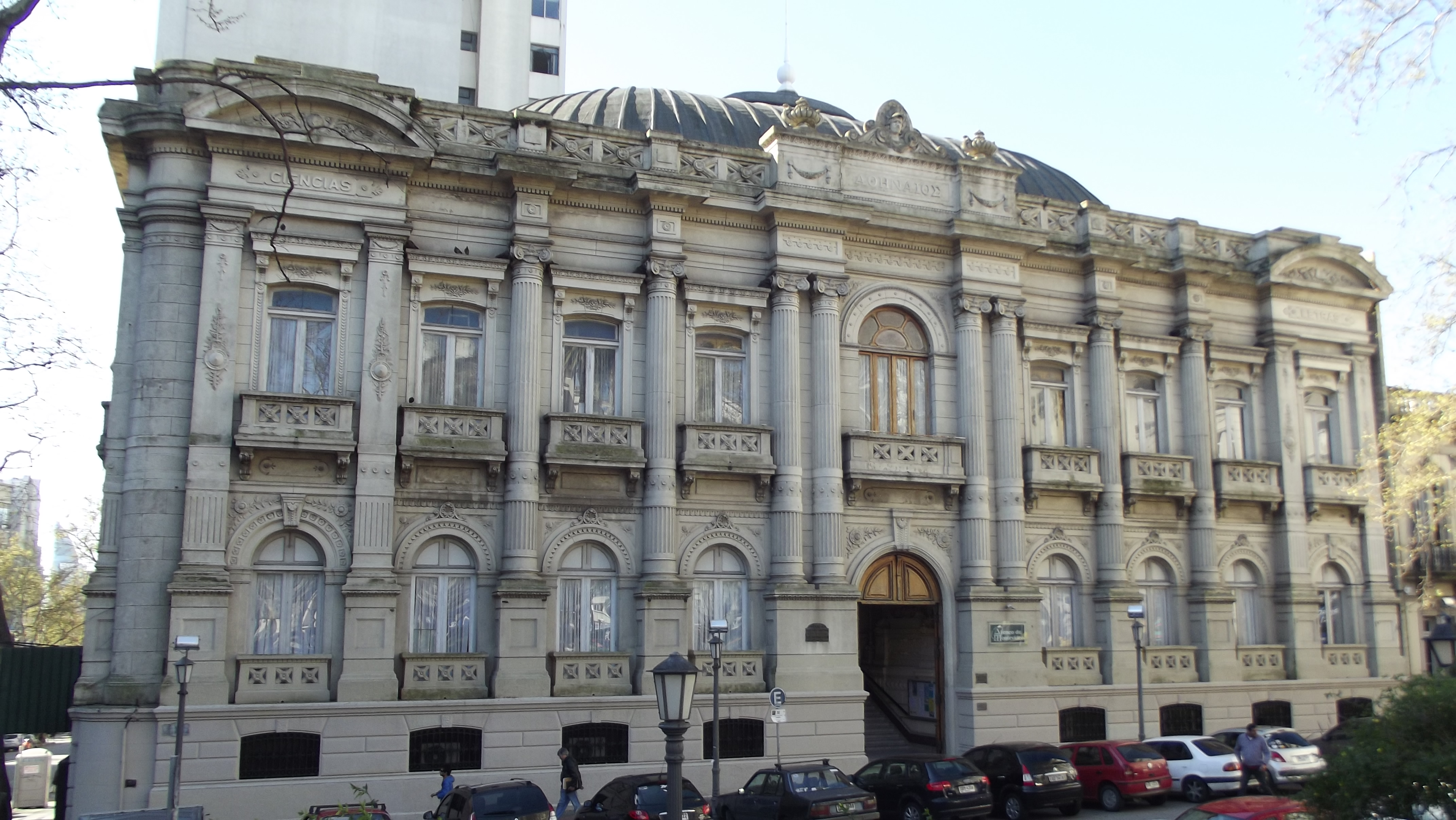
- Formation: July 3, 1886; 140 years ago
- Coordinates: 34.905446°S 56.191230°W
- President: Leonardo García Posas
- Website: ateneodemontevideo.uy

The Athenæum of Montevideo (Spanish: Ateneo de Montevideo) is a cultural institution in Montevideo, Uruguay. Founded on July 3, 1886 with the merger of the Sociedad Universitaria and the Ateneo del Uruguay, it is housed in an eclectic-historicist style building located on the Plaza de Cagancha in Centro.

== History ==
Ateneo de Montevideo, 1910

The Ateneo de Montevideo was founded as a cultural and educational club on July 3, 1886, with the merger of the Sociedad Universitaria and the Ateneo del Uruguay associations. It began as a free university that sought to break out of the state system dominated by the political changes and religious dogmatism prevailing in Uruguayan society at the time.

After its founding, it promoted the educational reform designed in the second half of the 19th century by José Pedro Varela ―one of the founders of the Ateneo―, together with the Society of Friends of Popular Education.

Assembly Hall

In 1900, a building was inaugurated to house the institution. Located at the intersection of the Plaza de Cagancha ring road and Rondeau Street, the two-story building in an eclectic style had been started in 1897 by the architects José María Claret, Julián Masquelez and Emilio Boix. In 1915, the team made up of the architects Horacio Azzarini, Julio Vilamajó and the sculptor José Luis Zorrilla de San Martín was in charge of decorating the large assembly hall on the upper floor.

In March 1939, it hosted the International Congress of American Democracies within the framework of the rise of totalitarian regimes in Europe. In 1940, the Ateneo, evoking its "democratic tradition and the imperative of its moral conscience," issued a statement repudiating fascism and communism, as well as world war that began the previous year.

In December 1954, the Circular Theater of Montevideo was inaugurated in the basement of the Ateneo building on Rondeau Street. In 1975, within the framework of the "Year of Orientality", the building was designated as a National Historic Monument.

== Activities ==
Throughout its history, the Ateneo headquarters have served to host events of a very diverse nature, whether cultural, political, philosophical or religious. In 1900, Pedro Figari held the first exhibition of foreign posters and the first competition for national artists. In addition, in 1937 the Independent Hall was created with works by artists such as Joaquín Torres García and Carmelo de Arzadún, which was a counterproposal to the simultaneous National Hall of Fine Arts organized by the Ministry of Public Instruction under the dictatorship of Gabriel Terra.

The Ateneo de Montevideo housed the workshop of the painter Joaquín Torres García, and later his museum, until it was closed by the civil-military dictatorship in 1973. In 2014 the building hosted the presidential debate ahead of the general election of that year. It currently serves as an exhibition, cultural and educational center where different courses are taught. On the occasion of Heritage Day, the building opens its doors to be visited by the public.
