= Priests of the Sacred Heart of Jesus of Bétharram =

- Prêtres du Sacré-Cœur de Jésus de Bétharram
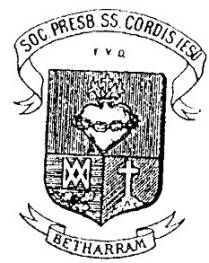
- Abbreviation: SCI di Béth
- Formation: 1832; 194 years ago
- Founder: Saint Michel Garicoïts, SCI di Béth
- Founded at: Bétharram, France
- Type: Clerical Religious Congregation of Pontifical Right (for Men)
- Headquarters: Rome, Italy
- Members: 271 members (205 priests) as of 2025
- Superior General: Eduardo Gustavo Agín, SCI di Béth
- Parent organization: Catholic Church
- Website: betharram.net

The Priests of the Sacred Heart of Jesus of Bétharram (French: Prêtres du Sacré-Cœur de Jésus de Bétharram; abbreviated SCI di Béth) is a Roman Catholic clerical religious congregation of Pontifical Right for men. It was established in Bétharram in 1832 by St. Michael Garicoits as fulfilment of a dream. The task of this congregation, dedicated to the Sacred Heart, was to evangelize the people through missions and to teach the young. It received the formal approval of the pope after Garicoits' death.

The members of the order live in small communities of 3 or 4 men in Argentina, Brazil, Central African Republic, France, Great Britain, India, Israel, Italy, Ivory Coast, Jordan, Palestine, Paraguay, Spain, Thailand and Uruguay.

Formal accusations of excessive corporal punishment and sexual abuse from 1957 to 2004 by priests of the order and staff at the Notre-Dame de Bétharram school, in Lestelle-Bétharram, France—the Bétharram scandal—led to an official enquiry, the Bétharram Commission, being set up in 2025.
