= Architecture of Uruguay =

The architecture of Uruguay is influenced by the country's gentle geography, its relatively recent history, and its melting-pot culture, bearing a strong European imprint.

== Overview ==
No significant architectural remains was left of the ancient native cultures. Beginning with the Spanish colonisation could be seen the very beginnings of local construction; but the establishment of populated places took a long time compared with Argentina and other neighboring regions. Santo Domingo Soriano, the oldest locality, was established as a mission in 1624; Colonia del Sacramento, a Portuguese outpost, in 1680; and the future capital city, Montevideo, in 1726, taking advantage of its namesake bay, a natural harbour. Notable examples of early architecture in Uruguay are the ruins of Saint Francis Xavier Convent in Colonia, San Miguel Fort, Santa Teresa Fortress, Saint Charles Church, the Cathedral and Cabildo of Montevideo.

Population growth was slow: in 1800 there were 30,000 people in the whole territory; thirty years later, when the country was officially established as a republic, there were just 70,000 inhabitants (of which, 14,000 in Montevideo). Many people in the countryside chose to build huts in straw and mud, and urban houses were very simple. At the same time, the country was in a permanent state of civil unrest; this meant that progress in construction was slow. Some works were destroyed in wars, such as the Basilica of Paysandú during a siege in 1865 (it was later rebuilt).

From the mid-19th century onwards, architecture began showing its splendour; several foreign architects, especially from Italy and France, brought their European styles and knowledge. A magnificent example of this time is the Solís Theatre, actually an opera house (Carlo Zucchi, 1856). In 1888 the University of the Republic included architecture among its degree programs; it got an extra boost some decades afterwards thanks to the French professor Joseph Carré. Many notable professionals graduated from the School of Architecture and started a notable development process of the built environment. Some architects worth mentioning are: Alfredo Jones Brown (Alfredo Vásquez Acevedo Institute, 1911), Juan Antonio Scasso (Estadio Centenario, 1930), Juan Aubriot (Edificio Lapido, 1933), Carlos Surraco (Hospital Clinic Manuel Quintela, 1928–1953), Mauricio Cravotto (Montevideo City Hall, 1947), Raúl Sichero (Edificio Panamericano, 1964). Some had international projection: Julio Vilamajó was an external consultant for the building of the United Nations headquarters (1947); Román Fresnedo Siri designed the PAHO Headquarters in Washington, DC (1965); Carlos Ott built the Opéra Bastille in Paris (1989).

Nowadays, Uruguay is a showcase of different architectural styles, combining high-tech skyscrapers, discreet Art-Deco family houses, historical eclectic buildings, and hidden treasures from colonial times.

=== Cityscape ===
Urban planning has also played an important role in Uruguay. Since colonial times, in accordance with the Laws of the Indies, cities were laid out in a grid pattern, which is seen everywhere in cities and towns.

Later on, large green spaces, the French landscape architects Carlos Thays and Charles Racine designed notable parks and squares, notably the Parque Rodó. Important avenues such as the Artigas Boulevard gave Montevideo the appearance of a big city. High-end homes also play an important part in this sense.

However, cities in Uruguay are already familiar with the regional issue of shanty towns, popularly known as cantegril, from the end of the 20th century onwards.

=== Ramblas ===
The cityscapes in Uruguay would be unthinkable without the Rambla of Montevideo, the popular promenade along the coastline, part of the intimate essence of this city. Other seaside cities have their own ramblas: Ciudad de la Costa (Rambla Costanera), Atlántida (Ramblas Tomás Berreta and Alfredo Zitarrosa), Piriápolis (Rambla de los Argentinos and Rambla de los Ingleses), Punta del Este (Ramblas Claudio Williman, Artigas and Lorenzo Batlle Pacheco); also some riverside cities, such as Colonia del Sacramento (Rambla de las Américas), Salto (Rambla Tomás Berreta), Mercedes and Fray Bentos.

== World Heritage ==
Uruguay is home to three UNESCO World Heritage Sites:

- the old city of Colonia del Sacramento,
- Fray Bentos industrial landscape,
- Iglesia de Cristo Obrero y Nuestra Señora de Lourdes, Atlántida.

There are other places included in the UNESCO tentative list:

- Rambla of Montevideo, promenade along the coastline of the River Plate, stretching 22 kilometers.

== See also ==
- List of tallest buildings in Uruguay

== Gallery ==
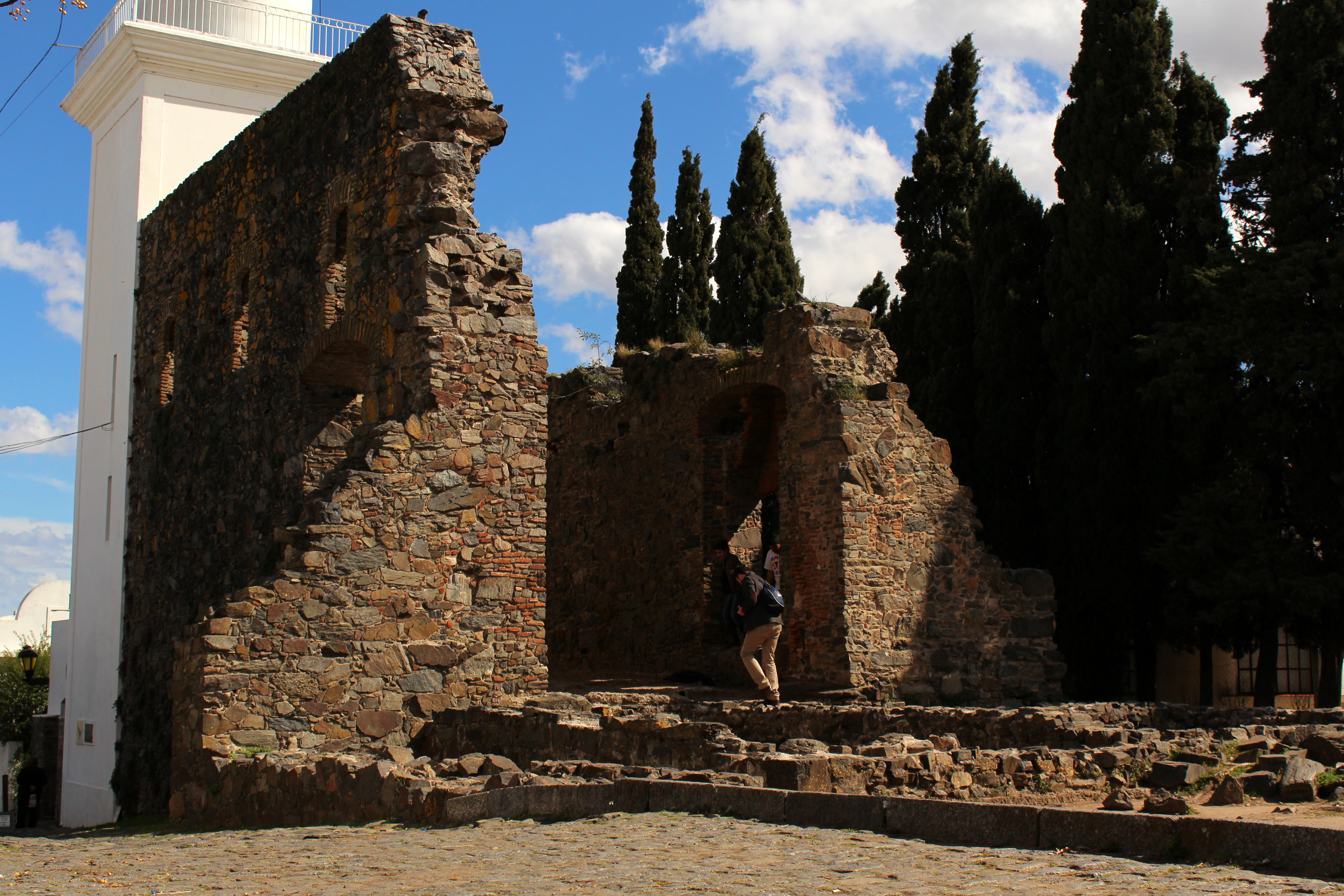
Saint Francis Xavier Convent, Colonia del Sacramento, ca. 1680.

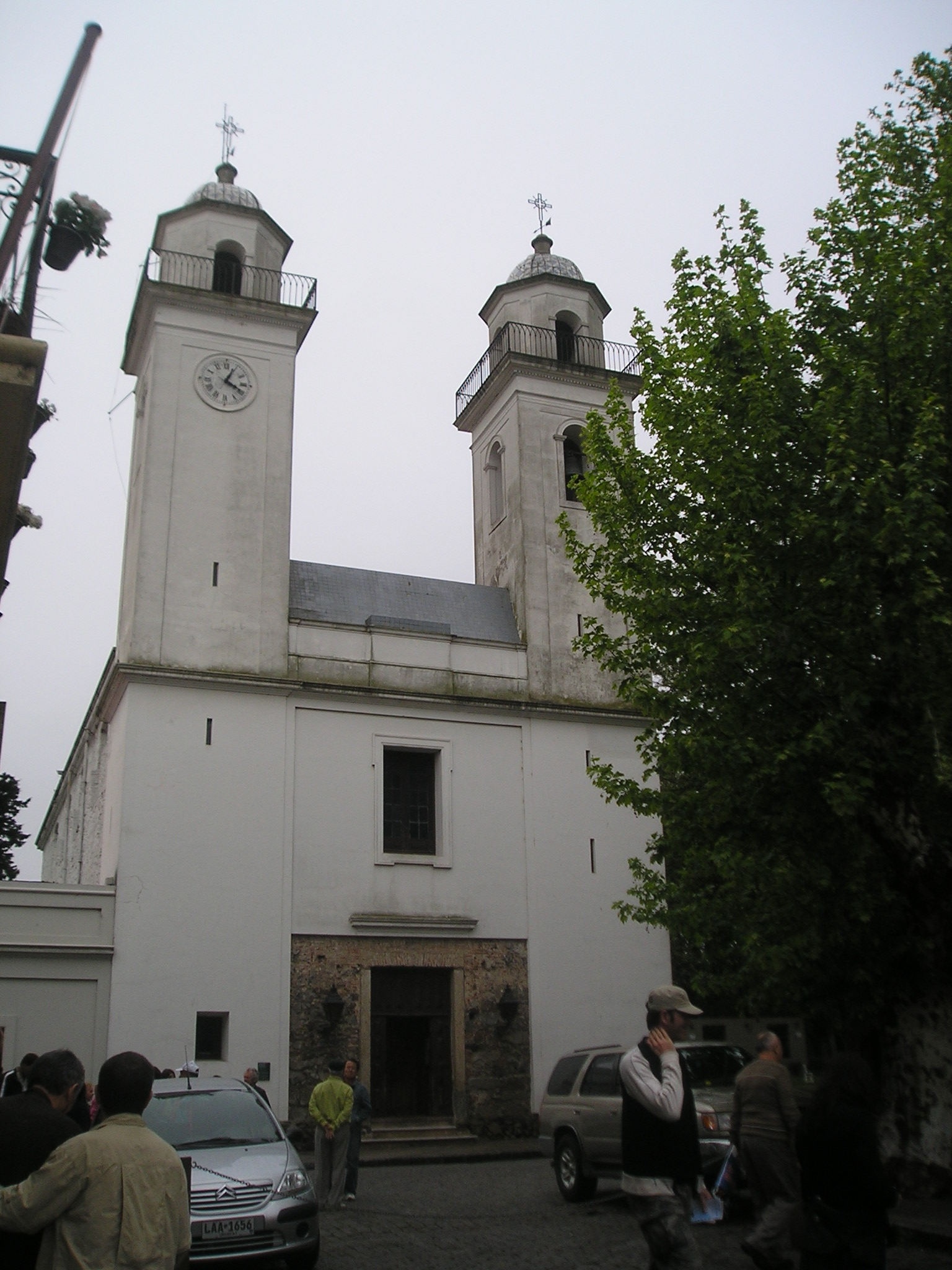
Holy Sacrament Basilica, Colonia del Sacramento, 1680/1810/1841.

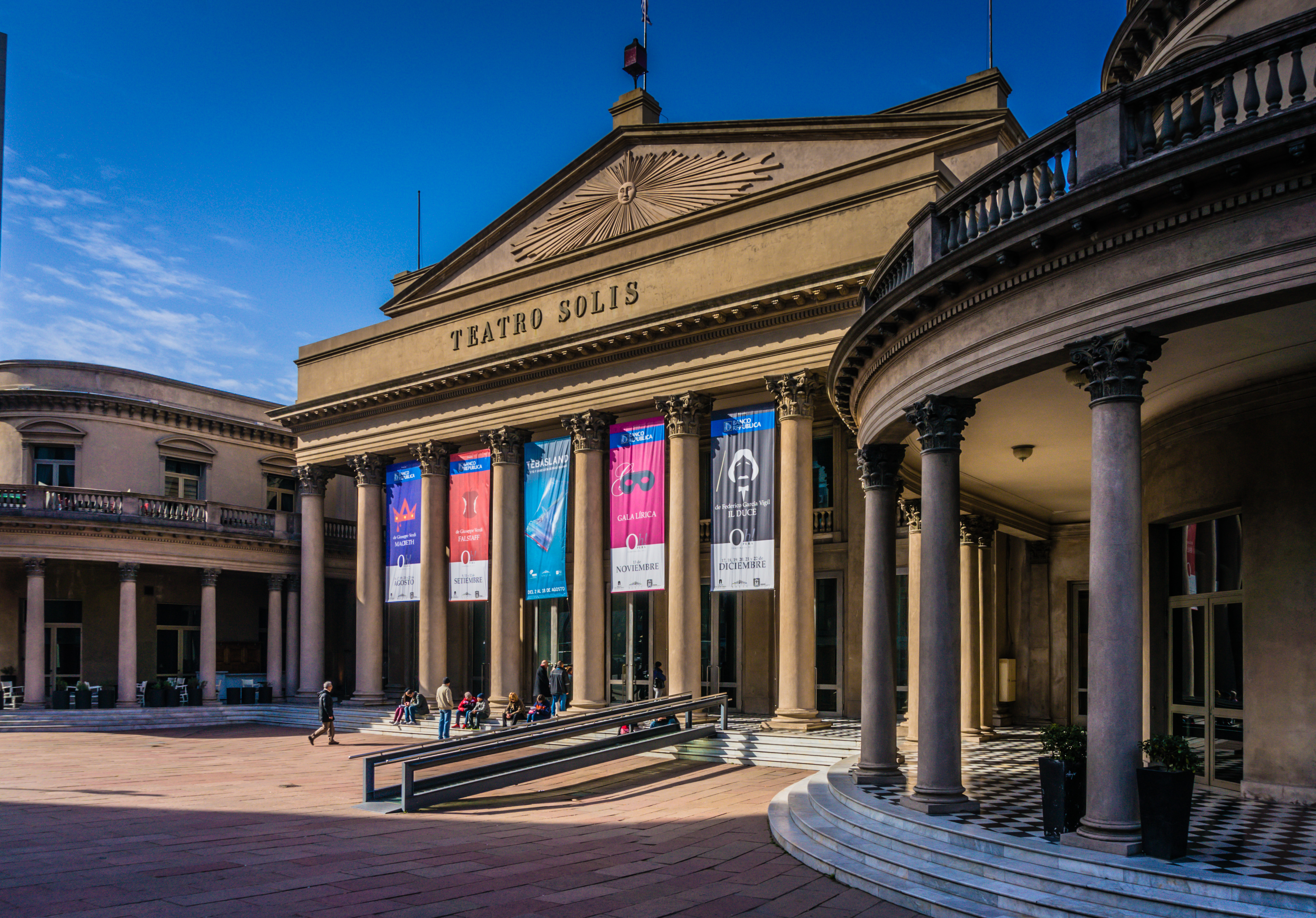
Solís Theatre, architect Carlo Zucchi, inaugurated in 1856.

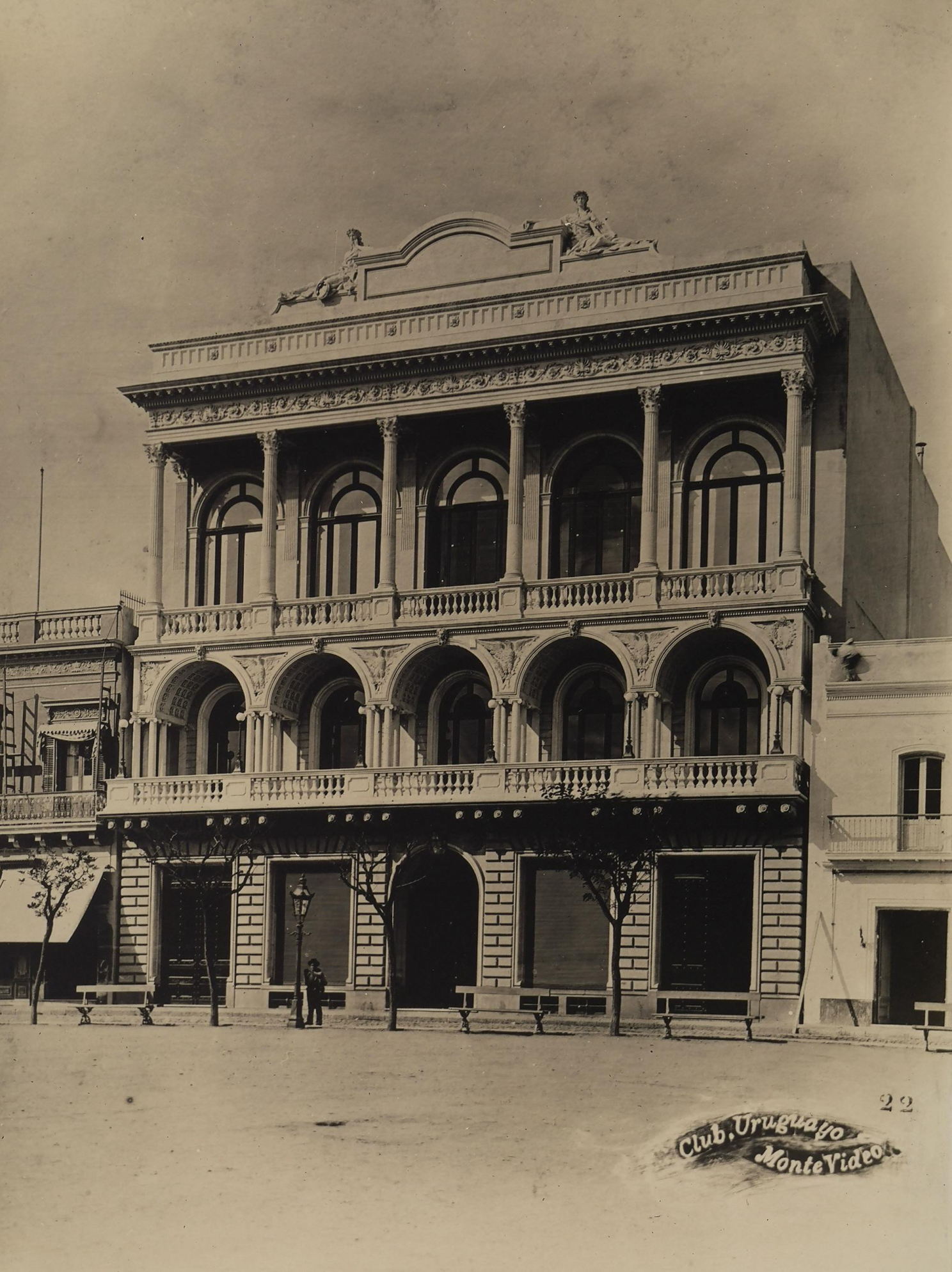
Club Uruguay, engineer Luigi Andreoni, inaugurated in 1888.

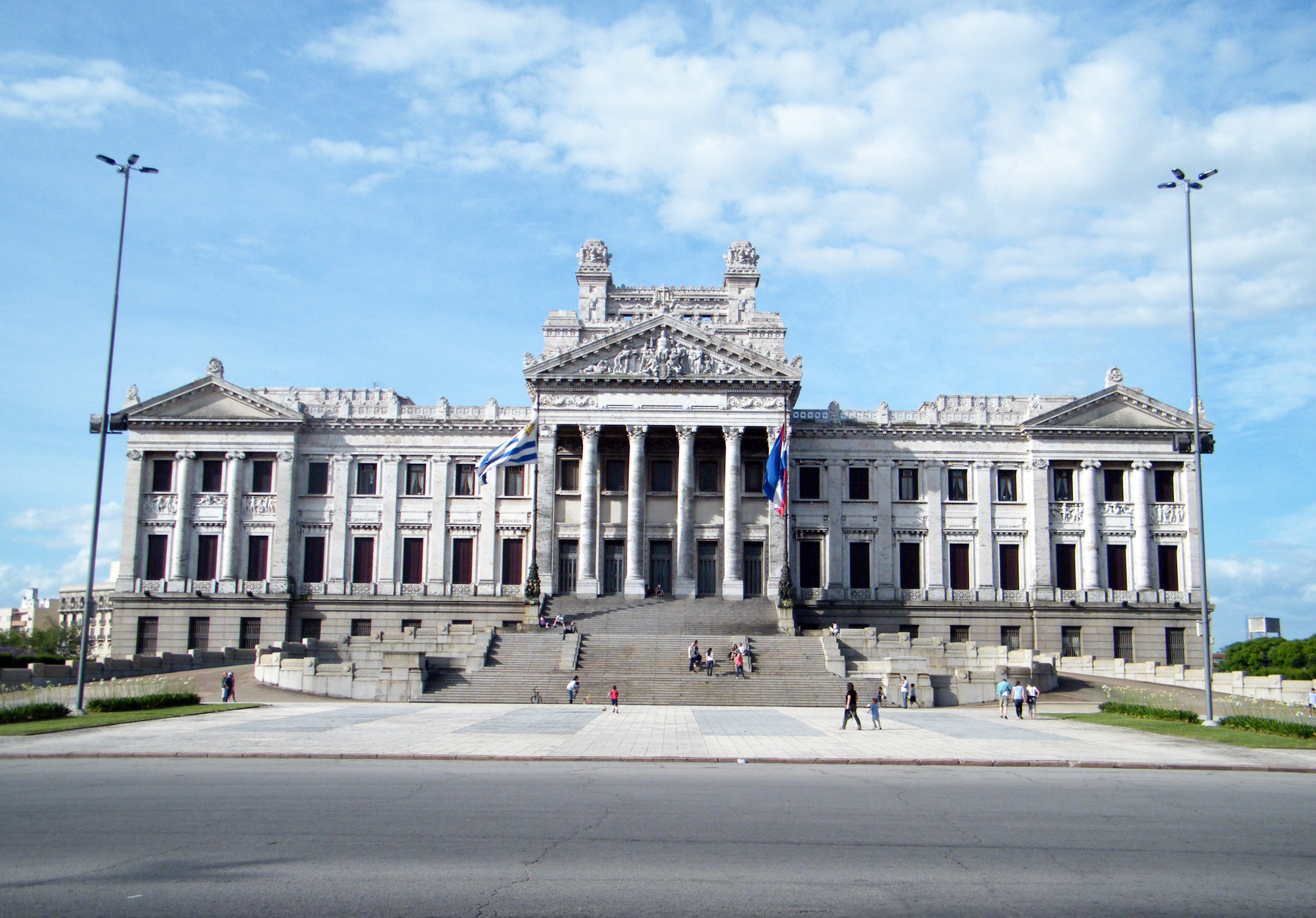
Legislative Palace of Uruguay, architects Vittorio Meano and Gaetano Moretti, inaugurated in 1925.

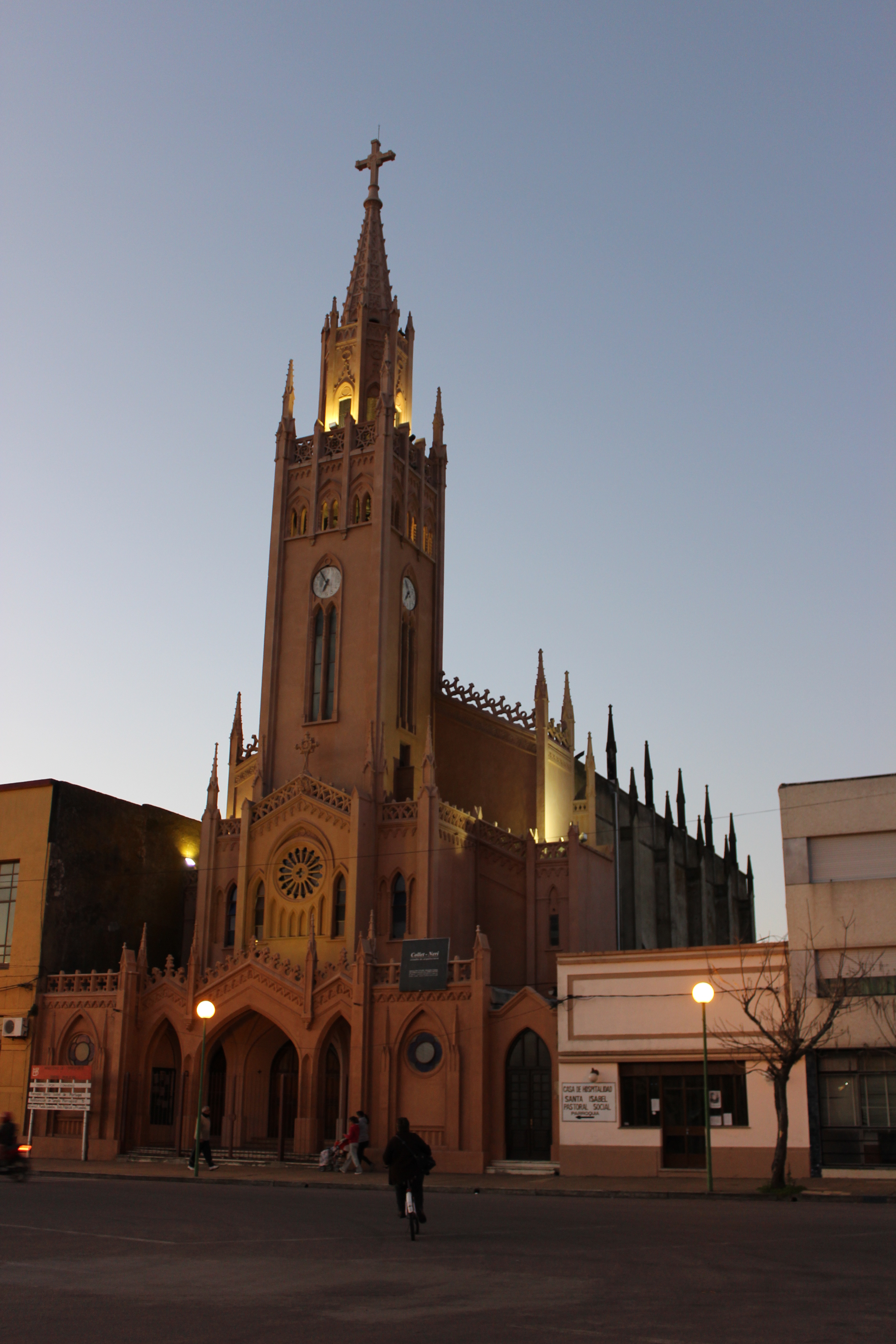
Saint Elizabeth's parish church in Paso de los Toros, architects Elzeario Boix and Horacio Terra Arocena, built in 1926.

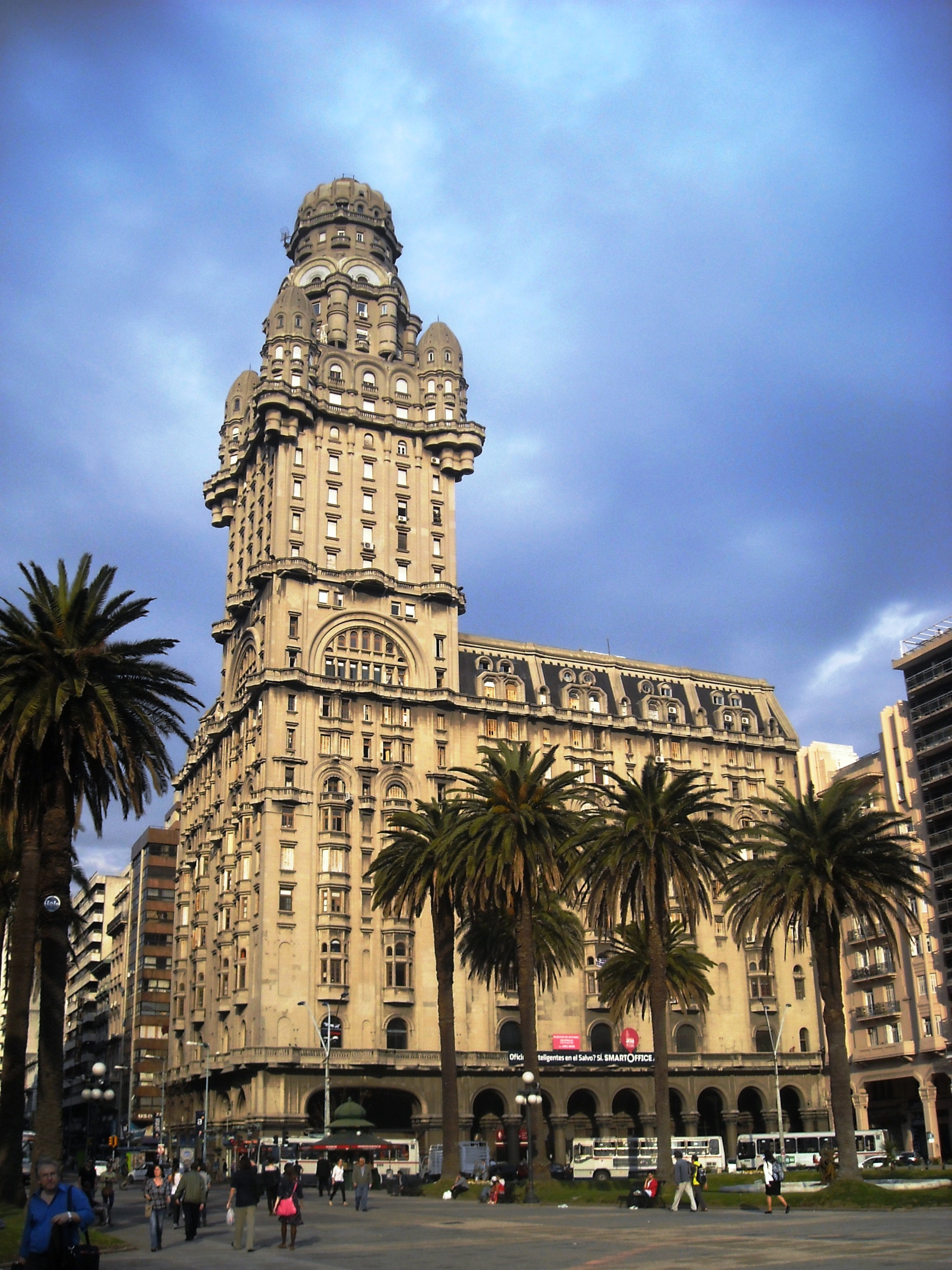
Palacio Salvo, architect Mario Palanti, completed in 1928.

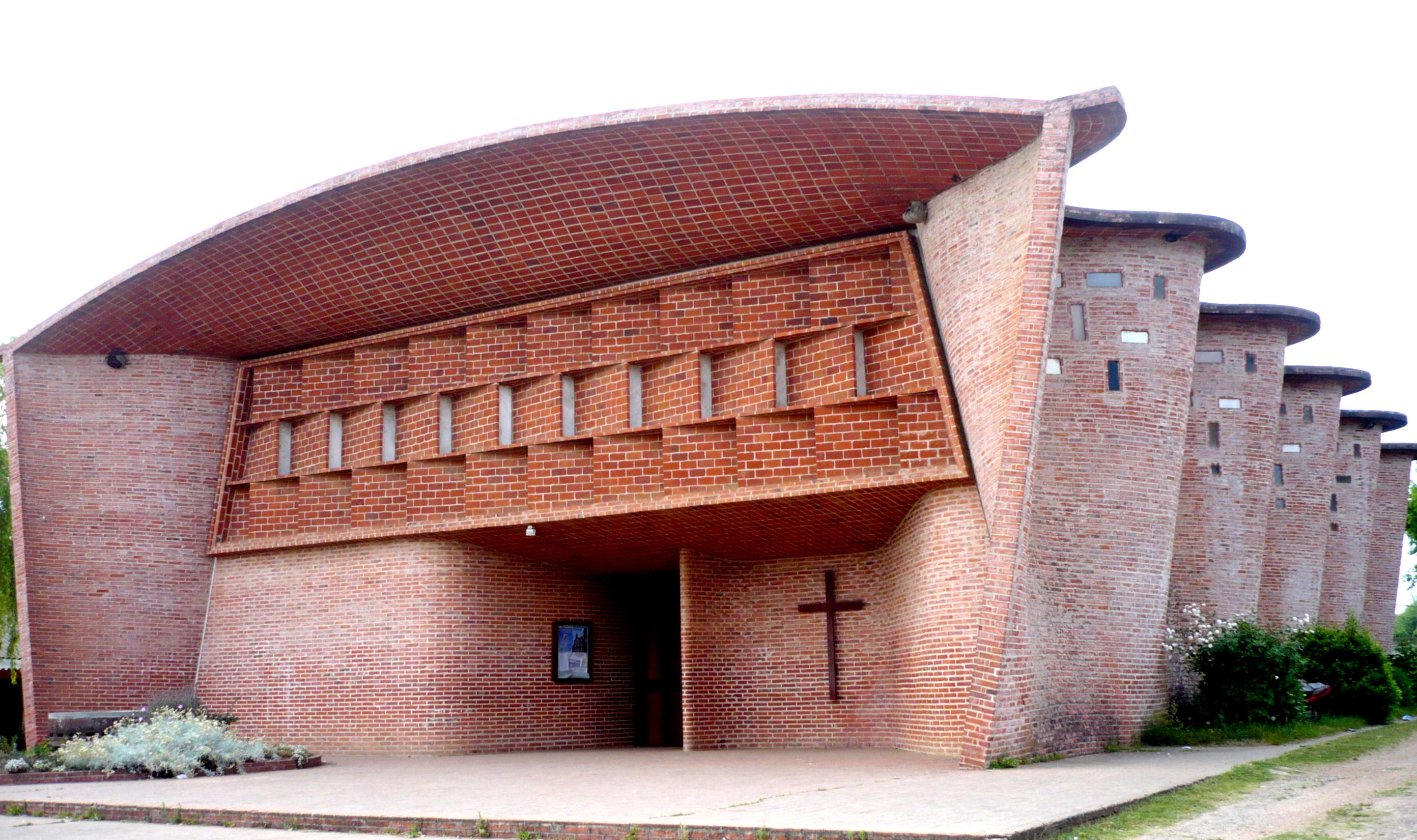
Church of Atlántida, engineer Eladio Dieste, consecrated in 1960.

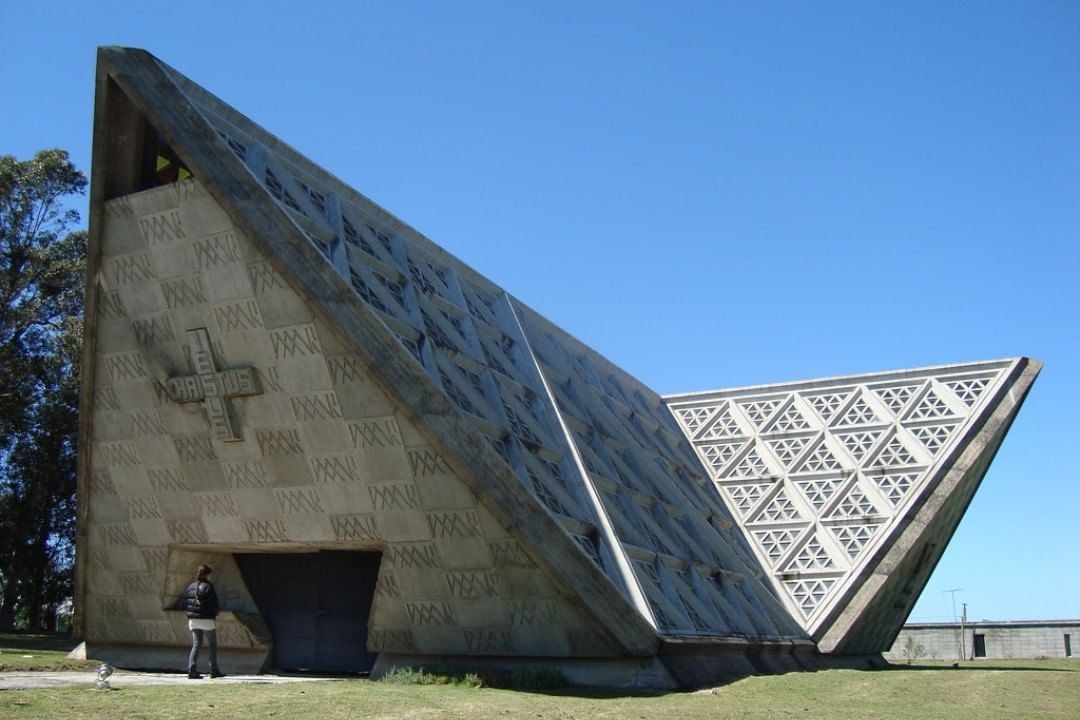
Susana Soca chapel, architect Antoni Bonet i Castellana, finished in 1966.

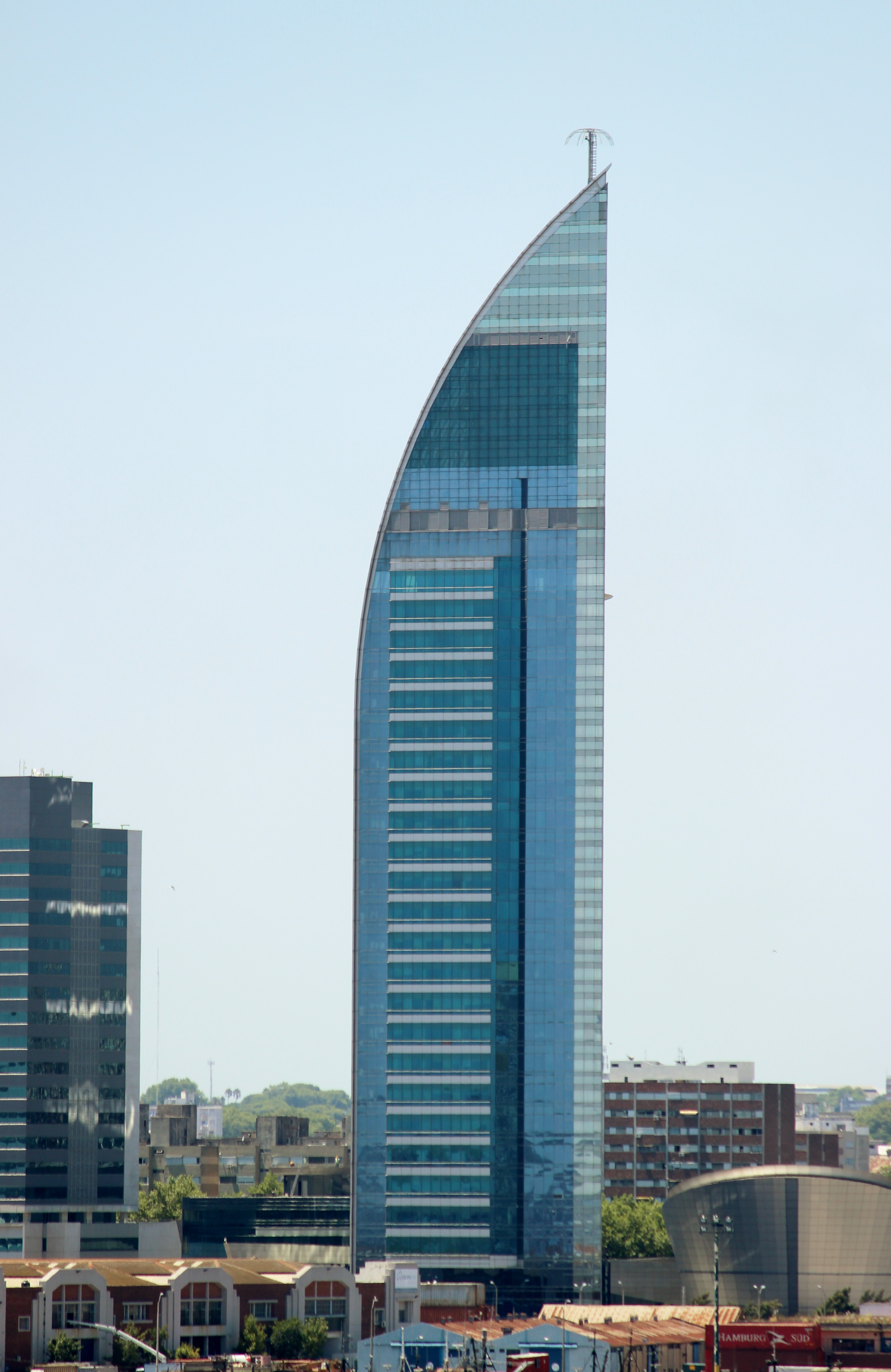
Telecommunications Tower, architect Carlos Ott, completed in 2002.

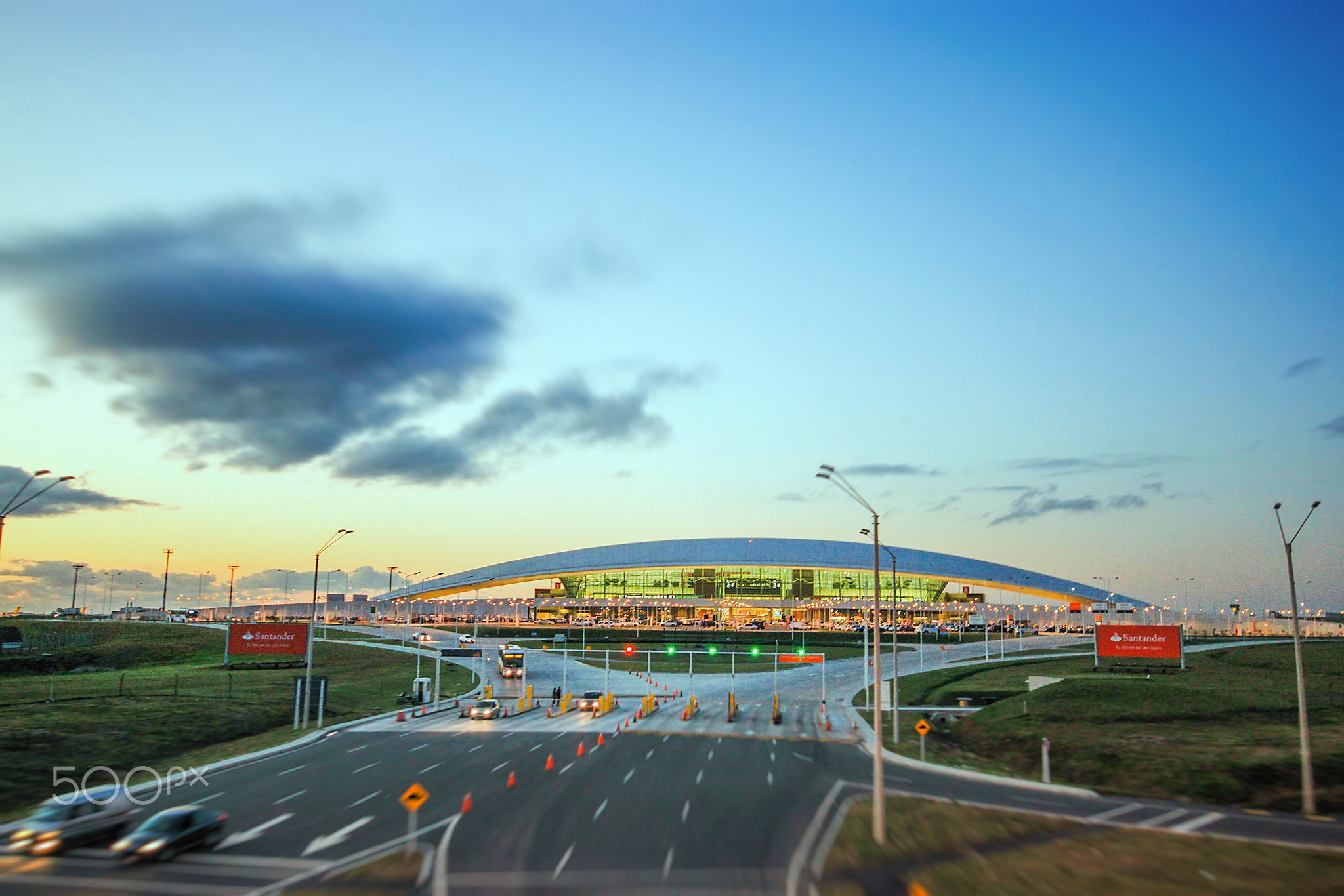
New terminal of Carrasco International Airport, architect Rafael Viñoly, inaugurated in 2009.

== Bibliography ==
- "Guia Arquitectonica y Urbanistica de Montevideo" (PDF) (in Spanish). Universidad de la República. 2010. p. 35.
- Lucchini, Aurelio (1969). Ideas y formas en la arquitectura nacional (in Spanish). Vol. 6. Montevideo: Colección Nuestra Tierra.
- Lucchini, Aurelio (1986). El Concepto de Arquitectura y su traducción a formas en el territorio que hoy pertenece a Uruguay (in Spanish). Montevideo: Universidad de la República.
- Ollero Lobato, Francisco; Rey Ashfield, William; Cebey Pariz, Soledad; Rimbaud Blengini, Tatiana (2025). Nuevas poblaciones en la banda oriental 1780 – 1805 (in Spanish). Colección Plural, CSIC, Universidad de la República, Uruguay.
- Rey Ashfield, William (2012). Arquitectura moderna en Montevideo (1920-1960) (in Spanish). Montevideo: Facultad de Arquitectura.
- Altman Macchio, Leonardo (2026). La construcción del boom. Turismo, territorio y escalas en Maldonado-Punta del Este (1974-1982) (in Spanish). Montevideo: CSIC-Udelar. p. 144.
