= Residencia de Suárez =

Official residence of the president of Uruguay

Suárez Residence
- Residencia de Suárez y Reyes
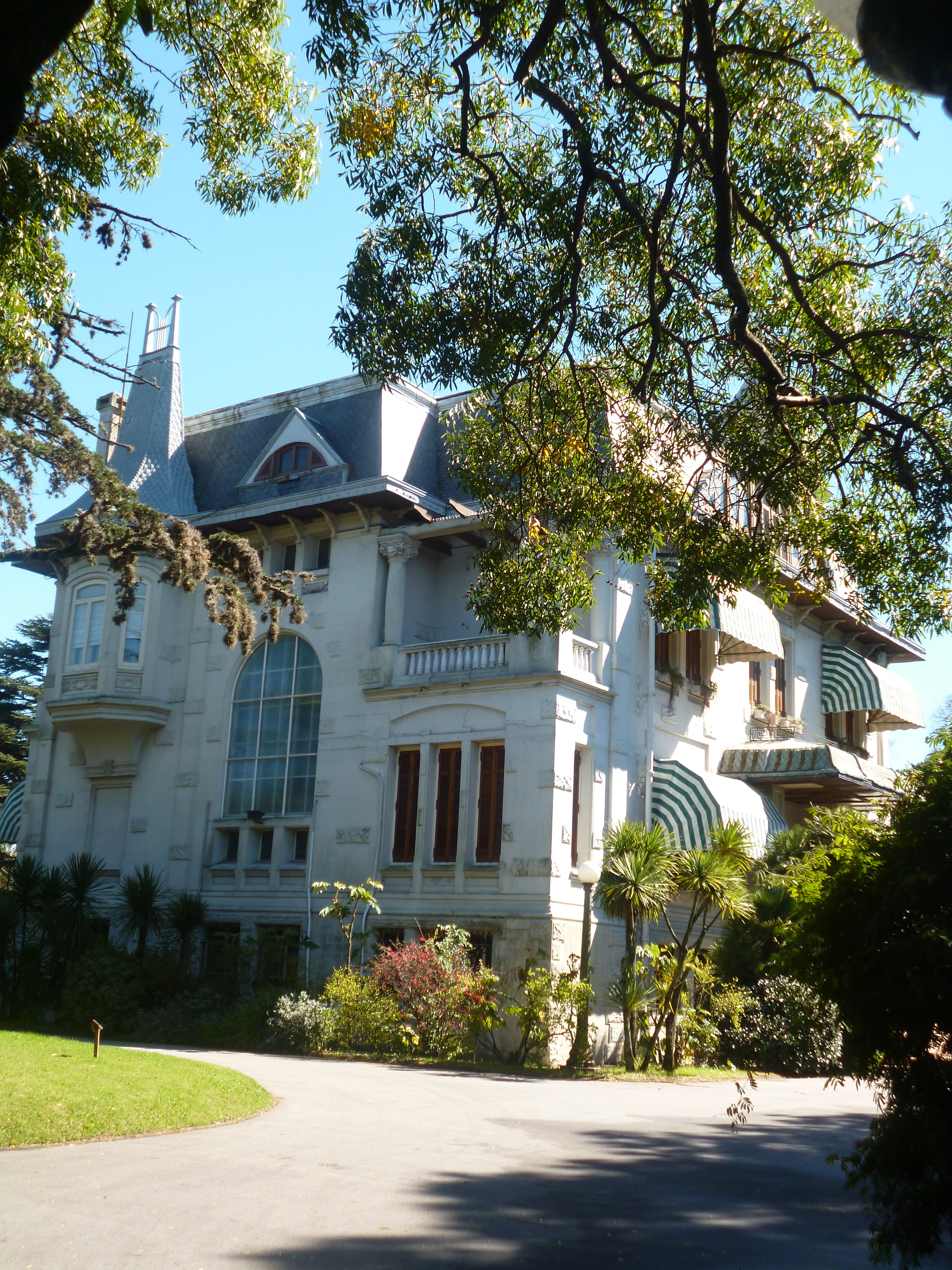
- Interactive map of the Suárez Residence area

General information
- Location: Joaquín Suárez 3773, Montevideo
- Construction started: 1907
- Completed: 1908
- Owner: Government of Uruguay

Design and construction
- Architect: Juan María Aubriot

The Suárez and Reyes Presidential Residence (Spanish: Residencia Presidencial de Suárez y Reyes), also known as Suárez Residence (Spanish: Residencia de Suárez), is the official residence of the president of Uruguay. Located in the Prado neighborhood of Montevideo, it is named after the intersection of Joaquín Suárez and 19 de Abril avenues, where Reyes Street begins.

Built in the early 20th century, it has served as the residence of Uruguayan presidents since 1947. While it is the official residence, the president's office and seat of government is the Executive Tower, located across from Plaza Independencia.

== History ==
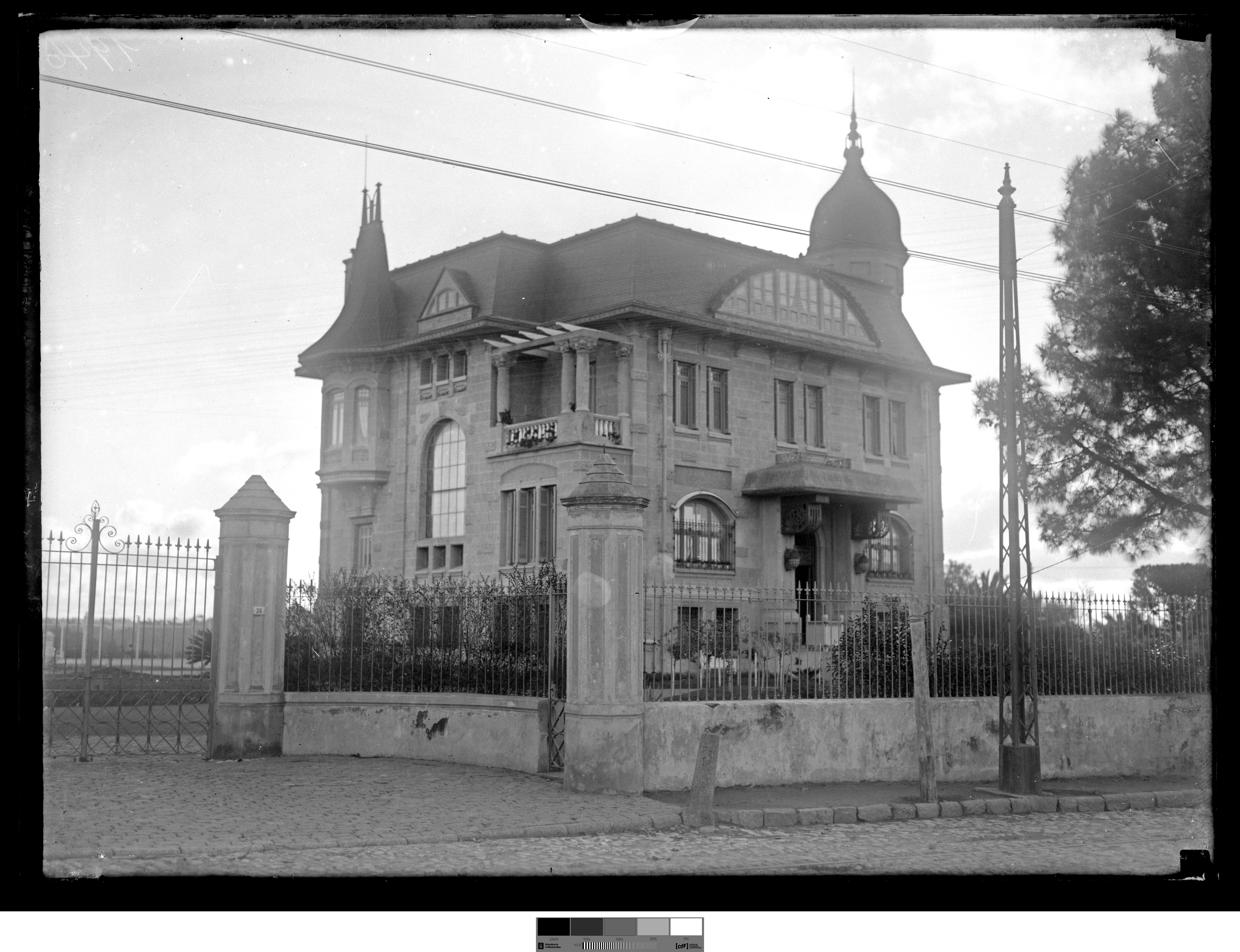
Fein Lerena state in 1918

In 1907, approximately twelve plots were auctioned in the Prado neighborhood of Montevideo, including the current site of the residence, which was acquired by Adelina Lerena de Fein. There, the Fein Lerena family commissioned the young architect Juan María Aubriot to design a three-story house as their retreat residence.

From the 1890s onward, the area became home to the country’s upper class, who erected grand houses and opulent multi-story palaces, complete with expansive gardens. The construction was ultimately completed in 1908.

After the death of the original owners, the family decided to sell the property, which was purchased by the German immigrant Werner Quincke and his wife Clara Hoffmann. Quincke commissioned architect Karl Trambauer to carry out several modifications, including the addition of a tower to the main facade. Later, the Quincke family transferred the residence to the Susviela Elejalde family, who, due to financial constraints, subsequently handed over their rights to the Intendancy of Montevideo, which rented it to be the headquarters of the Hydrographic Service of the National Navy.

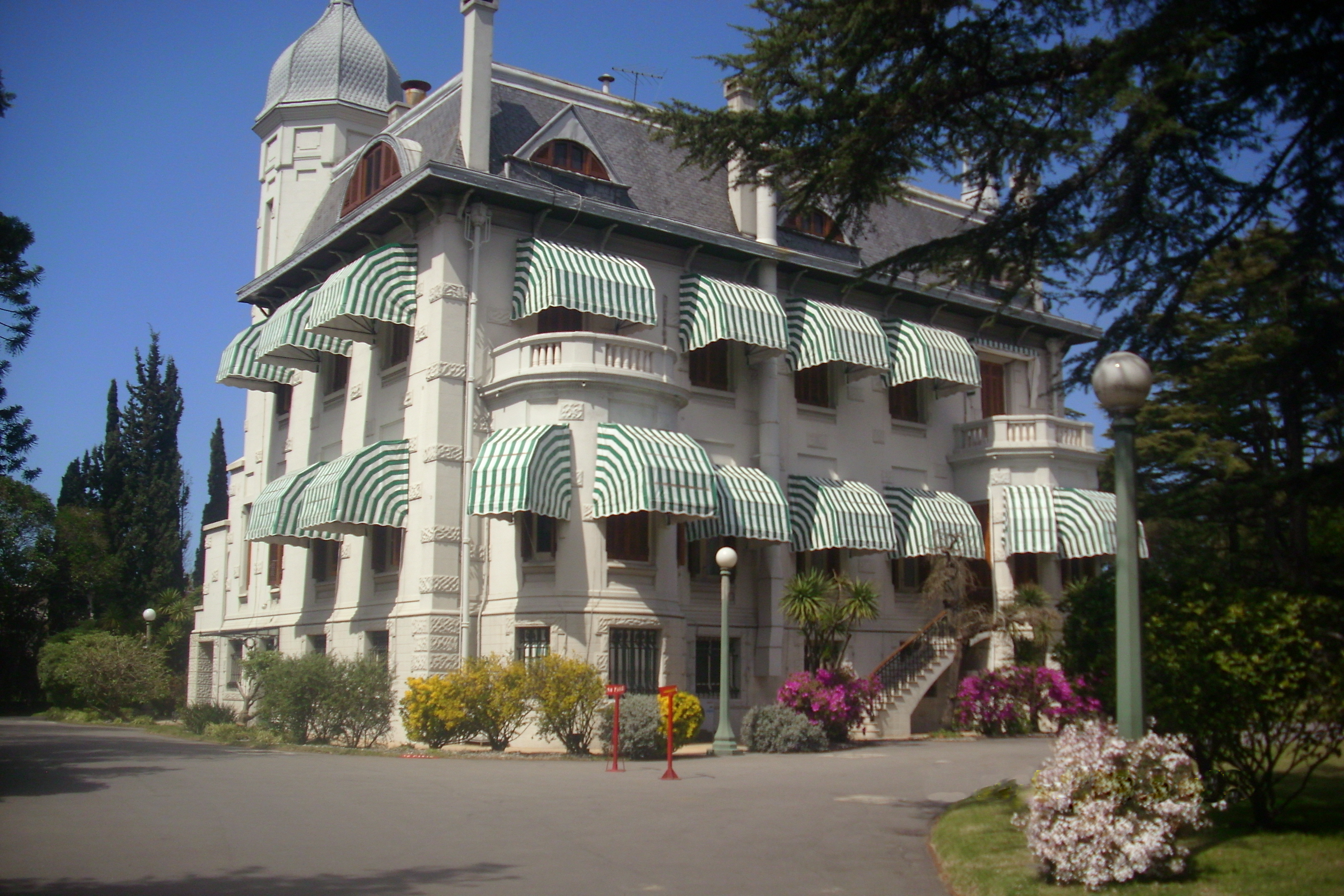
Rear facade of the house

In 1947, the Presidency of the Republic sought a permanent property to serve as the official residence of the President, as previous residences had been rented to accommodate the presidential family. On the recommendation of First Lady Matilde Ibáñez Tálice, President Luis Batlle Berres selected the "Quinta de Suárez," a property of sentimental significance to the couple, as they had first met in 1925 while walking in front of the estate.

The acquired residence underwent renovation work entrusted to architect Juan Antonio Scasso, who designed the Estadio Centenario. During the presidency of Jorge Pacheco Areco, adjacent lands were expropriated to integrate Bernardo Berro and Valdense streets into the residence’s grounds. In 1964, General Charles de Gaulle stayed in the house during his visit to Uruguay.

During the first administration of Julio María Sanguinetti, significant renovation works were carried out under the direction of architect Enrique Benech and visual artists Manuel Espínola Gómez and Enrique Medina.

== Description ==
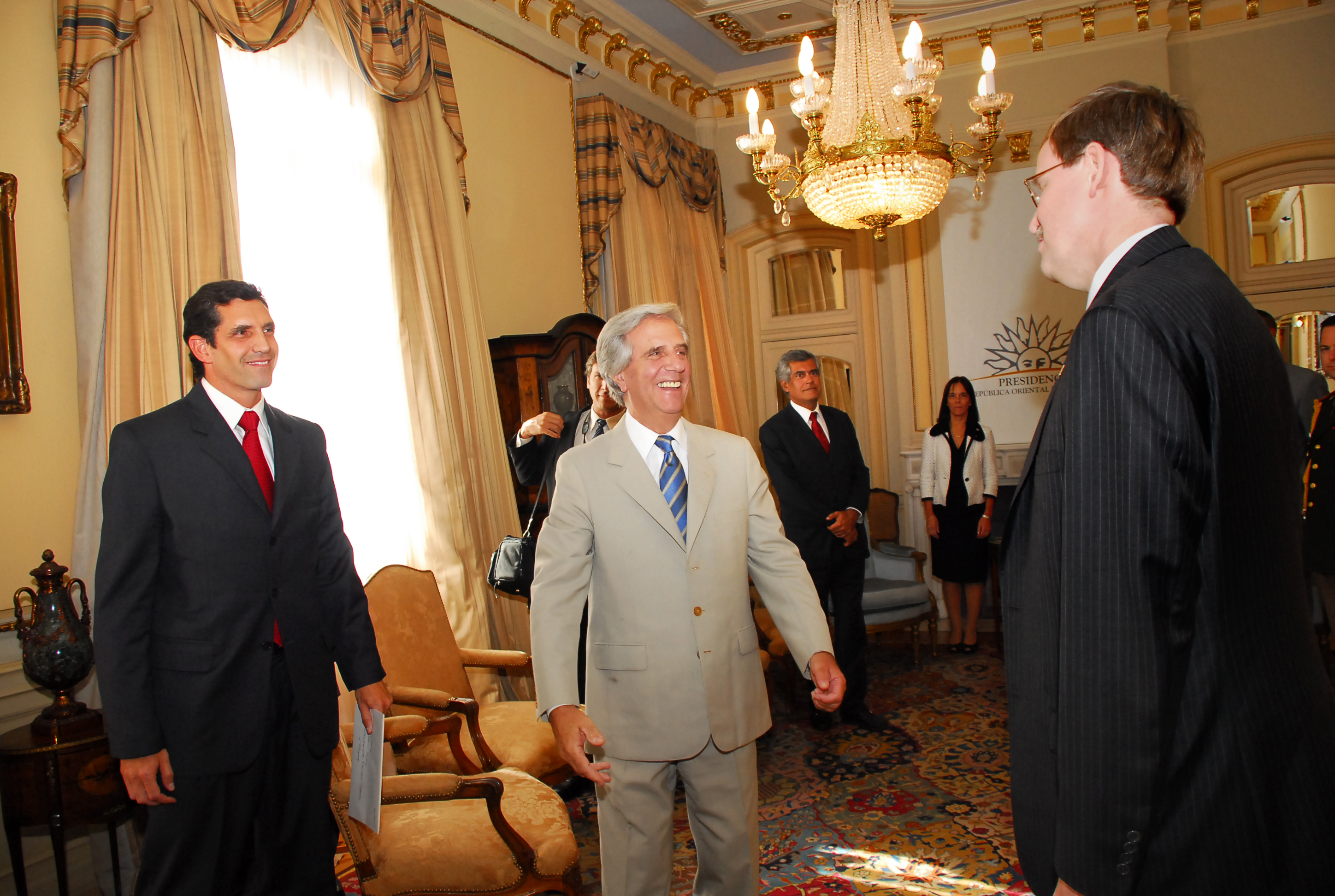
President Tabaré Vázquez and the U.S. Ambassador, David D. Nelson, in the reception room (formerly the music room).

The complex covers a total area of 3.8 hectares (9.4 acres), and includes a main residence, along with several other buildings serving various purposes.

The house is a three-story building. The kitchen and service area are located in the basement, the ceremonial spaces and offices on the first floor, while the private residence occupies the second floor. The main entrance features a marble staircase leading to the entrance hall, around which are the reception area, an imperial-style wooden staircase, and an elevator. The vestibule floor is adorned with Venetian mosaics featuring geometric patterns. Additionally, the imperial wooden staircase consists of an initial straight flight, followed by a landing, and then two opposing spiral flights ascending in the opposite direction of the first.

The ground floor features the entrance hall, which is flanked by the former dining room, the reception hall, and the presidential office. The former dining room now serves as the meeting room for the Council of Ministers, with an ornate ceiling adorned with intricate oak woodwork. Opposite this room is the reception hall, formerly known as the "Music Room," where the president meets with diplomats, foreign dignitaries, and guests. The room is furnished with Louis XV furniture and features an antique filing cabinet, an 18th-century garniture, and a vintage chandelier.

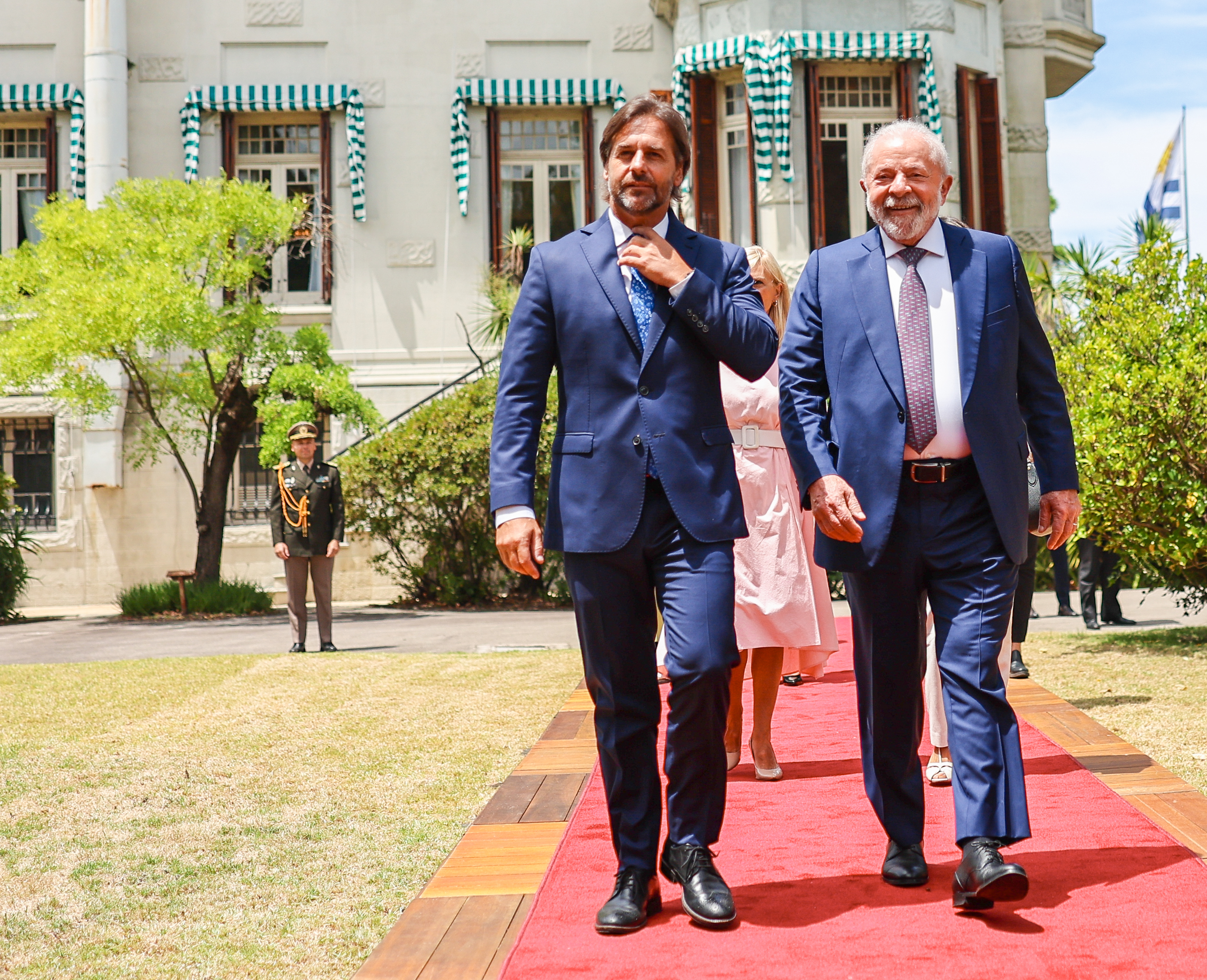
President Luis Lacalle Pou with Brazilian President Luiz Inácio Lula da Silva on the residence's grounds

The presidential office is elegantly decorated with oak boiserie and features a bow window overlooking the gardens. It is furnished with a mahogany desk, oak side tables, and Louis XV chairs upholstered in light blue. The decor includes a painting by Uruguayan artist Petrona Viera, a small equestrian sculpture by José Belloni, and a Persian carpet, a gift from the Prime Minister of India, Indira Gandhi. On the second floor is the residence, comprising a living room, dining room, and three bedrooms.

In addition to the main house, the complex includes several other structures. The former Municipal Meteorological Observatory, known as Suárez Chico (Spanish for 'Little Suárez'), houses a space used for informal meetings of the president and occasionally serves as a press room. The grounds feature an event pavilion, inaugurated in 1998, with a barbecue area where receptions are held, a rose garden with Carrara marble statues and a pond, a swimming pool, and a sports court that also functions as a helipad.

The residence's park showcases various tree and plant species, including cedrus deodara, juniperus chinensis, pinus canariensis, tipuana, and taxodium distichum. The complex opens its doors to the public on the occasion of Heritage Day.

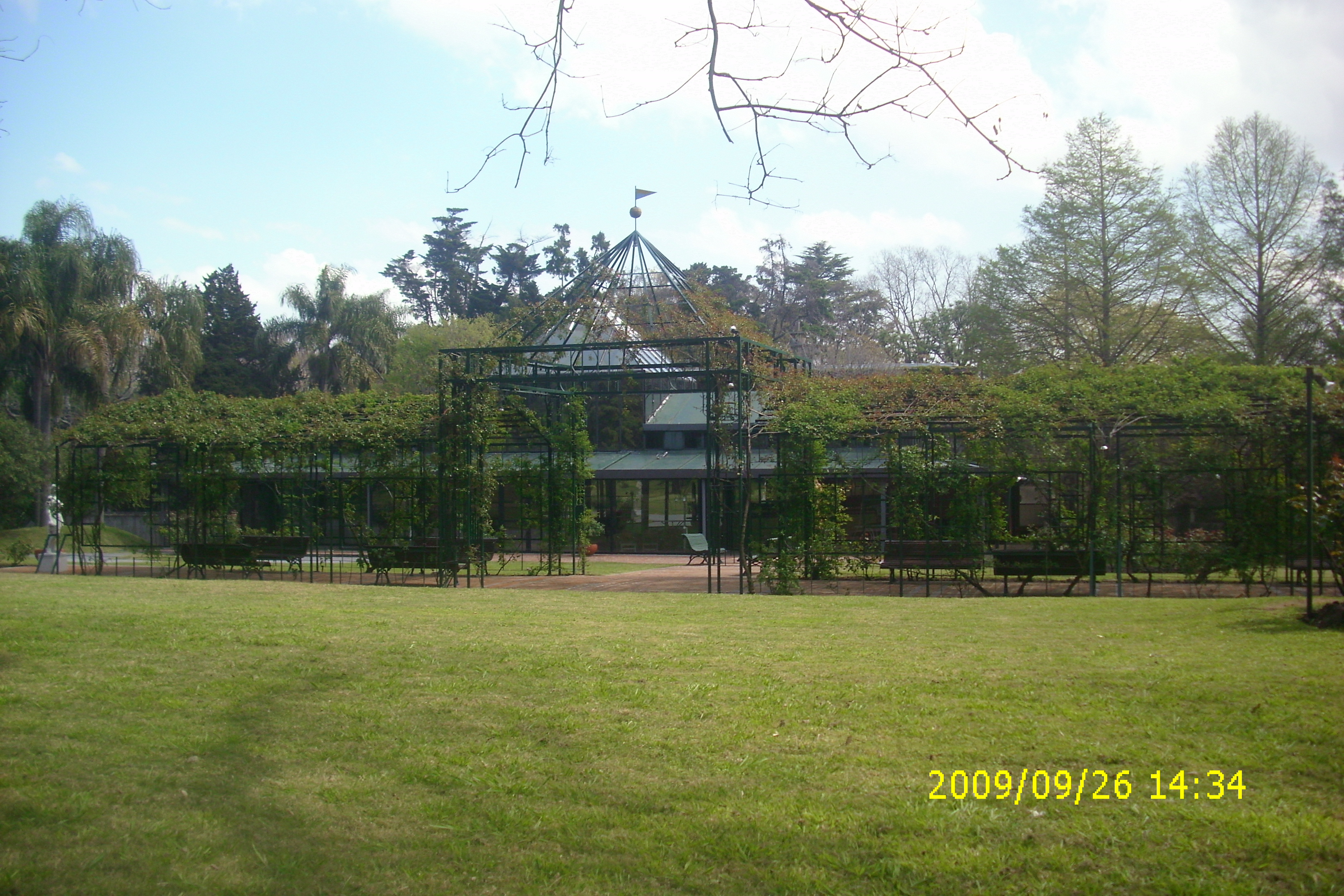
Rose garden

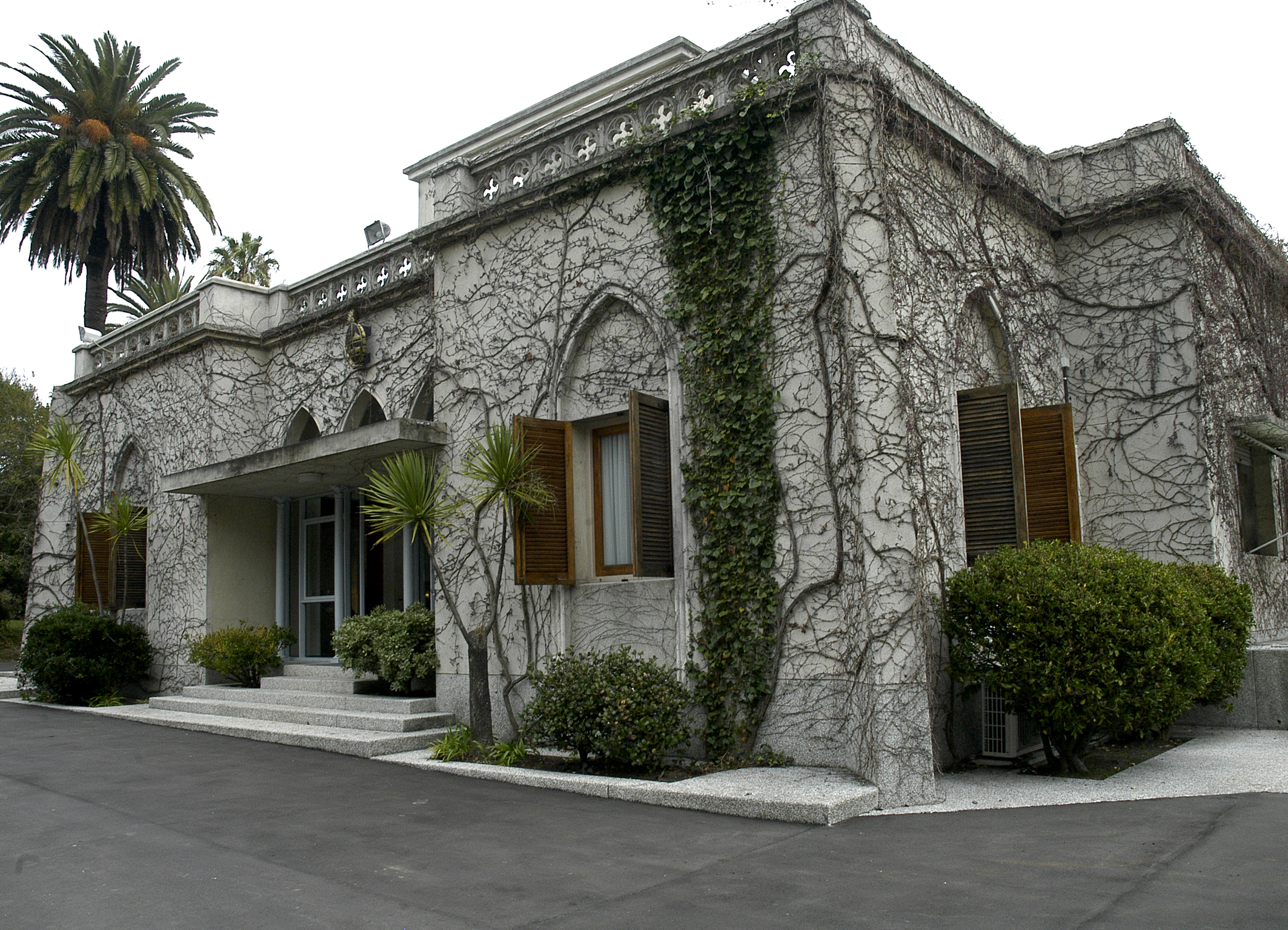
Suárez Chico

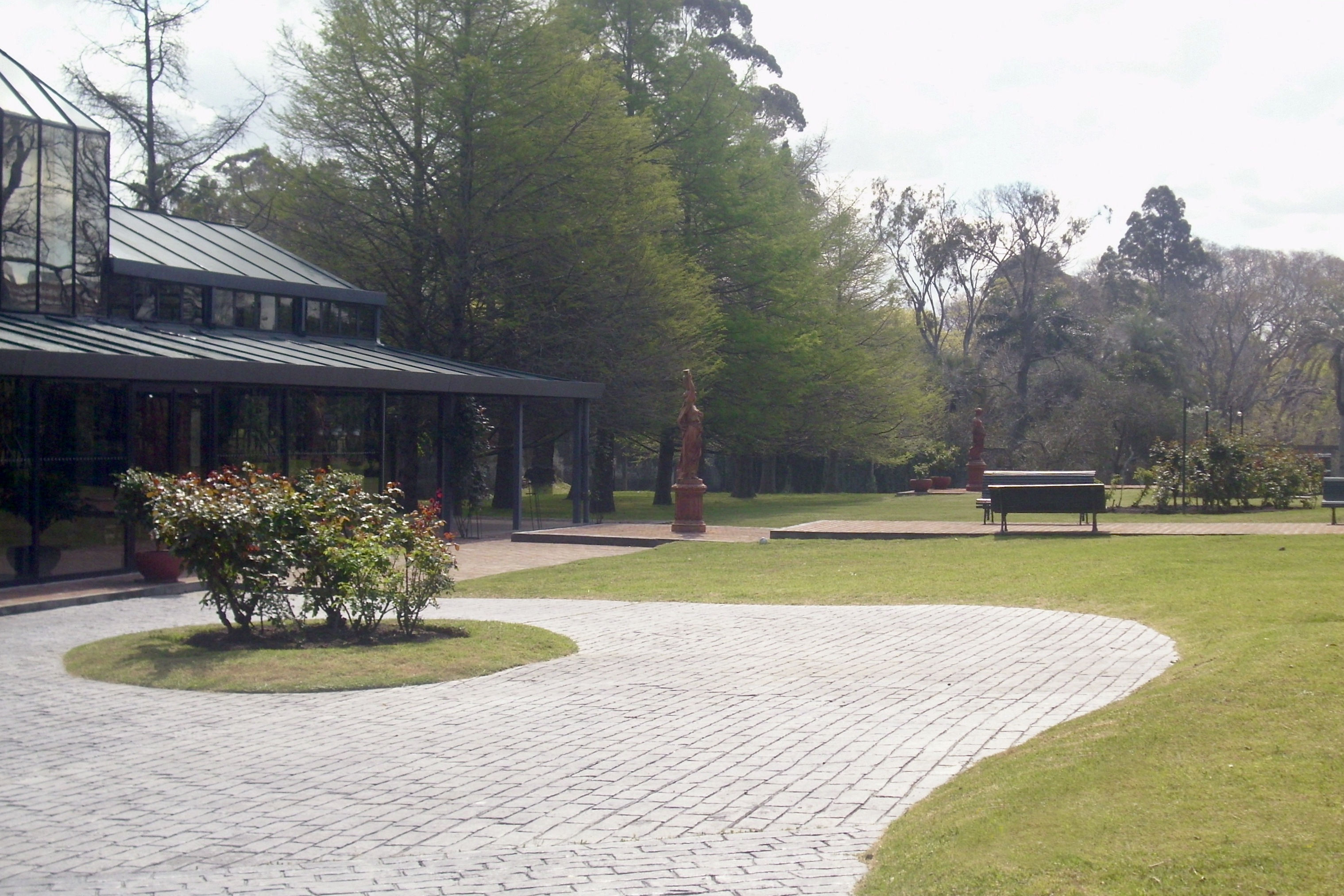
Events pavilion

== Residence ==
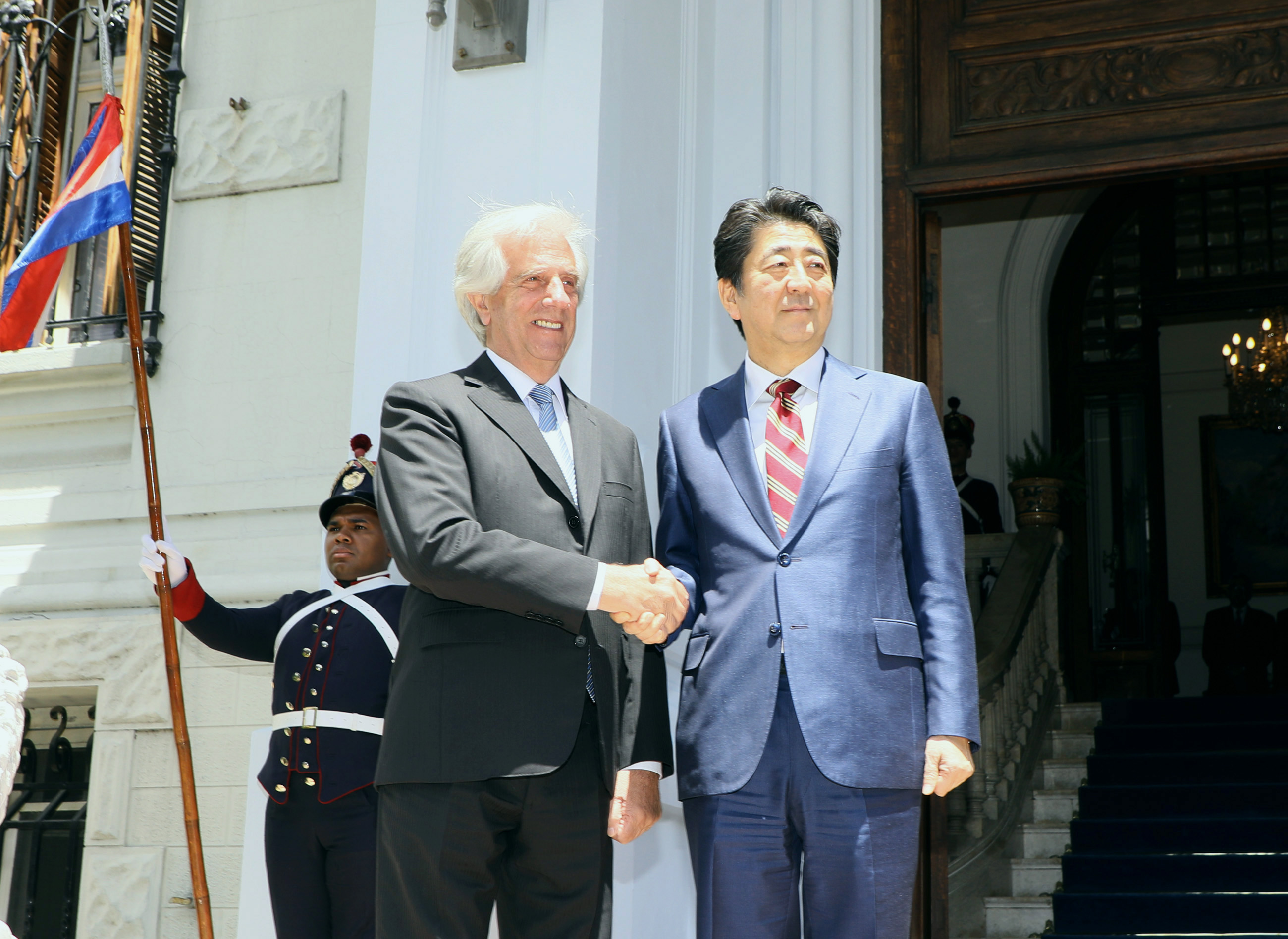
President Tabaré Vázquez with Japanese Prime Minister Shinzo Abe at the main entrance

Suárez y Reyes has served as the residence of Uruguayan presidents since 1947. However, between 1955 and 1967, the successive members of the National Council of Government, which governed with a collegial executive system, did not use the house. After the restoration of the single-person executive in 1967, the use of the presidential residence was resumed, continuing throughout the civic-military dictatorship (1973–1985) and following the democratic transition. Presidents Tabaré Vázquez, José Mujica, and Yamandú Orsi (all from the Broad Front) continued to reside in their private homes during their respective presidencies, while using the residence for official purposes.
