= Heritage Day (Uruguay) =

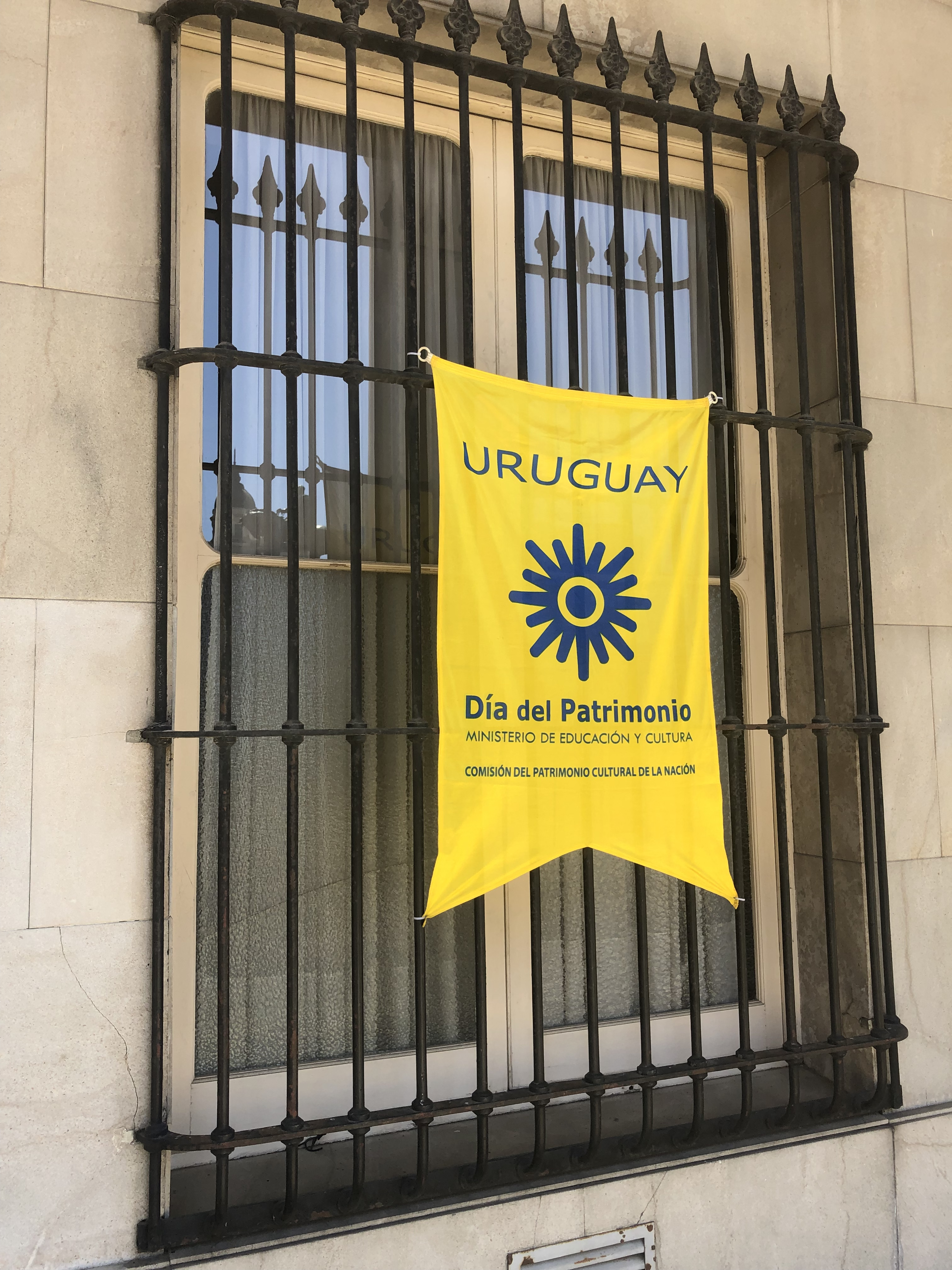
- Event emblem
- Observed by: Uruguay
- Date: First weekend of October
- Frequency: Annual
- First time: 1995; 30 years ago

The Heritage Day (Spanish: Día del Patrimonio) is an annual celebration of Uruguay's history and culture. It takes place the first weekend of October and is organized by the National Cultural Heritage Commission of the Ministry of Education and Culture.

Extraordinarily for two days, all museums, government buildings, historical monuments, educational institutions, buildings and private residences of historical, cultural or architectural interest are open to the public to be visited free of charge. Occasionally, special exhibitions or cultural activities are held.

== History ==
In 1995, at the initiative of architect José Luis Livni, Día del Patrimonio was celebrated for the first time, which lasted only one day and was held only in Montevideo. However, over the years the celebration gained popularity and was expanded to include different aspects of Uruguayan culture and history, so the places that could be visited increased and it was decided to hold it for a full weekend, without altering the name.

From 1995 to 2001 it was held on the second Saturday of September, and from 2002 to 2005 on the penultimate weekend of September. Finally, starting with the eleventh edition (2006), it began to be held on the second weekend of October.

== Editions ==
Year	Date	Honored	Slogan		Rfs.
Year	Date	Honored	Spanish	English	
1995	16 September	-	La ocasión de adentrarse en la herencia cultural	The opportunity to delve into the cultural heritage	
1996	14 September	José Luis Livni	–	–	
1997	13 September	Juan E. Pivel Devoto	–	–	
1998	12 September	Alfredo Campos	–	–	
1999	18 September	Luis Andreoni	Montevideo, con arquitectura de gusto europeo	Montevideo, with European style architecture	
2000	14 October	José Gervasio Artigas, 150 years after his death	–	–	
2001	15 September	Mauricio and Antonio Cravotto	–	–	
2002	21–22 September	Horacio Arredondo	–	–	
2003	20–21 September	Lauro Ayestarán	La identidad recuperada	The recovered identity	
2004	18–19 September	Joaquín Torres-García	–	–	
2005	24–25 September	Carlos Solé	–	–	
2006	07–08 October	Eladio Dieste	Tradición e innovación Eladio Dieste: El señor de los ladrillos	Tradition and innovation Eladio Dieste: The Lord of the Bricks	
2007	06–07 October	Rosa Luna, Martha Gularte y Lágrima Ríos	Apuesta cultural para una sociedad sin discriminación	Cultural commitment for a society without discrimination	
2008	04–05 October	Carlos Vaz Ferreira	Uruguay: país de pensamiento	Uruguay: country of thought	
2009	26–27 September	Bartolomé Hidalgo, Roberto J. Boston, Francisco Espínola, Carlos González, Juan José Morosoli, Yamandú Rodríguez, Aníbal Sampayo, Fernán Silva Valdés, Wenceslao Varela and Rubén Lena	Tradiciones rurales	Rural traditions	
2010	25–26 September	Florencio Sánchez, José Podestá, Trinidad Guevara, Alberto Candeau, Ángel Curotto, Atahualpa del Cioppo and Margarita Xirgú	Reconocimiento a los constructores del teatro uruguayo en el Día del Patrimonio	Recognition of the builders of the Uruguayan theater on Heritage Day	
2011	22–23 October	Bicentennial of Uruguay	La Redota; derrotero por la libertad y la unión de los pueblos	La Redota: path for freedom and the union of peoples	
2012	06–07 October	Anibal Barrios Pintos	El lenguaje de los uruguayos	The language of the Uruguayans	
2013	05–06 October	Tango	–	–	
2014	04–05 October	Public space, architecture and citizen participation	Apropiarse de los espacios públicos y compartirlos en comunidad	Take advantage of public spaces and share them in community	
2015	10–11 October	Twentieth anniversary of the inscription of Colonia del Sacramento to the World Heritage Site	La arquitectura en el Uruguay	Architecture in Uruguay	
2016	01–02 October	Public Education	Educación Pública; Integral, integradora, integrada	Public education: comprehensive, integrative, integrated	
2017	07–08 October	La cumparsita	Patrimonio vivo y universal	Living and universal heritage	
2018	06–07 October	70 years of the Universal Declaration of Human Rights	Patrimonio y Diversidad Cultural	Heritage and Cultural Diversity	
2019	05–06 October	Amalia de la Vega, 100 years after her birth	La música en Uruguay	Music in Uruguay	
2020	03–04 October	Manuel Quintela	Medicina y salud, bienes a preservar	Medicine and health, goods to preserve	
2021	02–03 October	José Enrique Rodó	Las ideas cambian el mundo	Ideas change the world	
2022	01–02 October	China Zorrilla, 100 years after her birth	Cultura de las dos orillas	Culture of both shores	
2023	07–08 October	Alfredo Jones Brown, Juan Antonio Scasso and José Scheps	Constructores de escuelas y liceos	School and high school builders	
2024	05–06 October	150th anniversary of vineyards and wine in Uruguay	El vino como tradición: inmigración, trabajo e innovación	Wine as a tradition: immigration, work and innovation	
2025	04–05 October	1825–1830: Bicentennial across the land	–	–	
