= Edificio Lapido =

Coordinates: 34°54′23″S 56°11′45″W

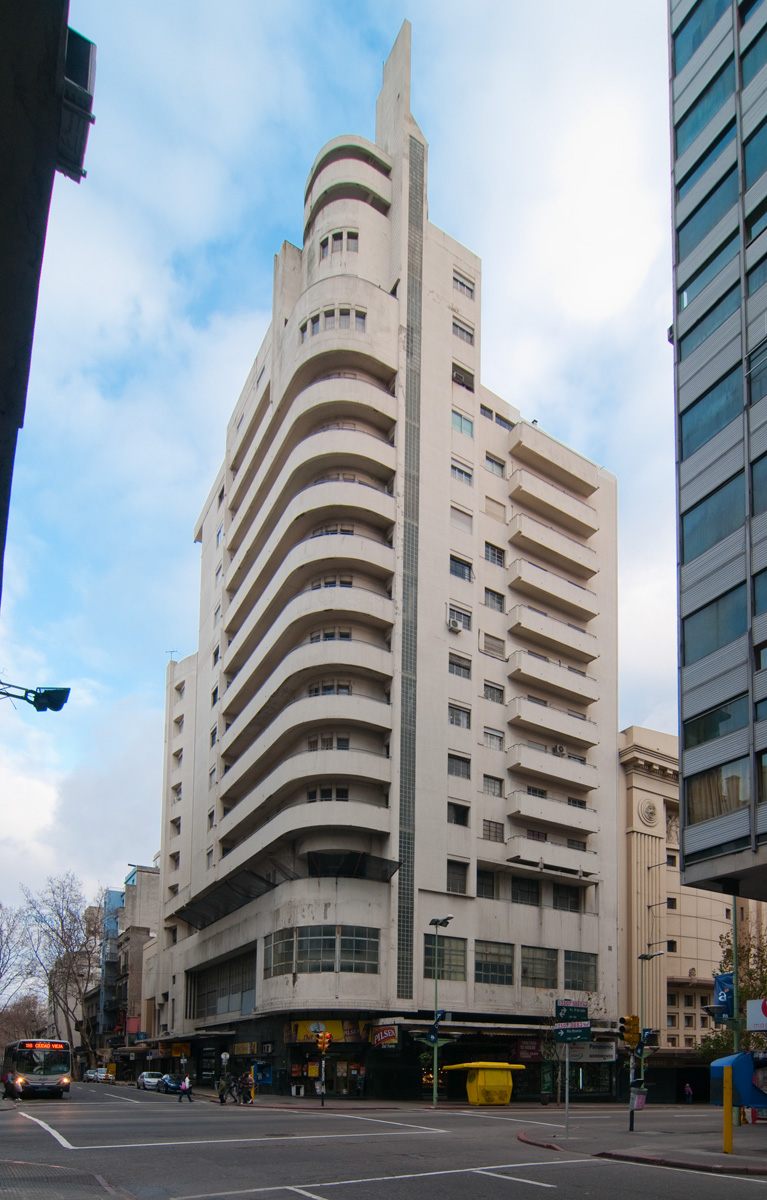
- Palacio Lapido in 2016.
- Interactive map of the Edificio Lapido area

General information
- Location: 18 de Julio Avenue in Centro, Montevideo Uruguay

Technical details
- Material: Reinforced concrete
- Floor count: 14

Design and construction
- Architect: Juan Aubriot

Lapido Building, also known as Lapido Palace, is a modernist building in Montevideo, Uruguay, located on 18 de Julio Avenue in the city centre. Designed by architect Juan Aubriot and completed in 1933, it is regarded as a representative example of Uruguay’s early 20th-century architectural renewal influenced by international trends. The building was designated a National Heritage Site in 1989.

The fourteen-storey building housed the headquarters of the newspaper La Tribuna Popular until the 1960s. During the civic–military dictatorship (1973–1985), clandestine opposition publications were produced there. It is currently used as a residential and office building. The ground floor contains commercial premises, including a Subway restaurant.
