= Intendancy of Montevideo =

Government of Montevideo Department

Intendency of Montevideo
- Intendencia de Montevideo
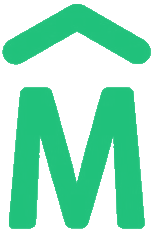

Departamental Executive Power overview
- Formed: 18 December 1908
- Jurisdiction: Montevideo Department
- Departamental Executive Power executive: Mario Bergara, Intendant of Montevideo
- Website: http://montevideo.gub.uy

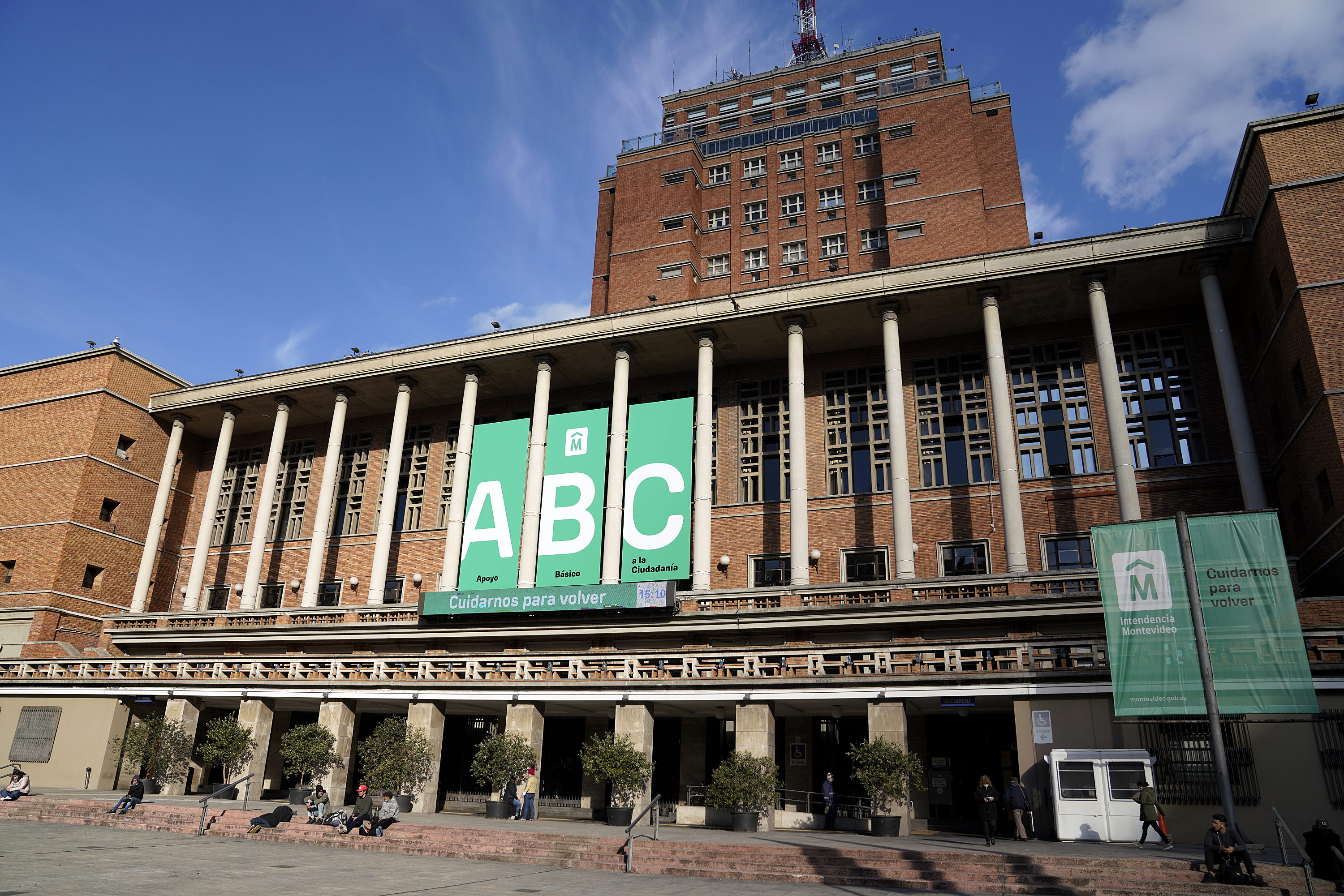
The City Hall, headquarter of the Government of Montevideo.

The Intendancy of Montevideo is the executive and administrative branch of the Department of Montevideo.

== Functions ==
The government entity functions as a second level of government, under the national government. It handles issues regarding the department as a whole and coordinates the process of decentralization, via the municipalities.

== History ==
Since the establishment of the Uruguayan state in 1830, the departmental command was executed by the Political and Police Chief of Montevideo. On December 18, 1908, the Law of Establishment of Departmental Intendancies was enacted, with Daniel Muñoz as the first Intendant of the Montevideo Department, who held the office from 1909 until 1911.

The intendancies were shortly removed in the Constitution of 1918 and reestablished by Gabriel Terra's coup d'etat in 1933 and the Constitution of 1934.

While the Constitution of 1952 once again suppressed them, they did not disband until February 1955 when they were replaced by the Departmental Council, which was a collegial executive, composed of seven members.

Intendancies were definitively reestablished by the Constitution of 1967, still in force. From 1967 to 2009 it was known as "Municipal Intendancy of Montevideo", but with the introduction of the "third level of government", which was the creation of the municipalities, the departmental executive was renamed as Intendancy of Montevideo.

== Decentralization ==
Since 1990, Montevideo has been partially decentralized into 18 areas; administration and services for each area is provided by its Zonal Community Center (Centro Comunal Zonal, CCZ), which is subordinate to the Intendancy of Montevideo. The boundaries of the municipal districts of Montevideo were created on 12 July 1993, and successively amended on 19 October 1993, 6 June 1994 and 10 November 1994. In 2010, the city CCZ were abolished and eight municipalities were created instead.
