= Juan María Aubriot =

Uruguayan architect (1876–1930)

Juan María Aubriot (1876–1930) was a Uruguayan architect.

Some of his most important buildings are:

- School of Law, University of the Republic
- Residencia de Suárez
- Edificio Lapido
