= City Hall of Montevideo =

Architectural structure

Palacio Municipal
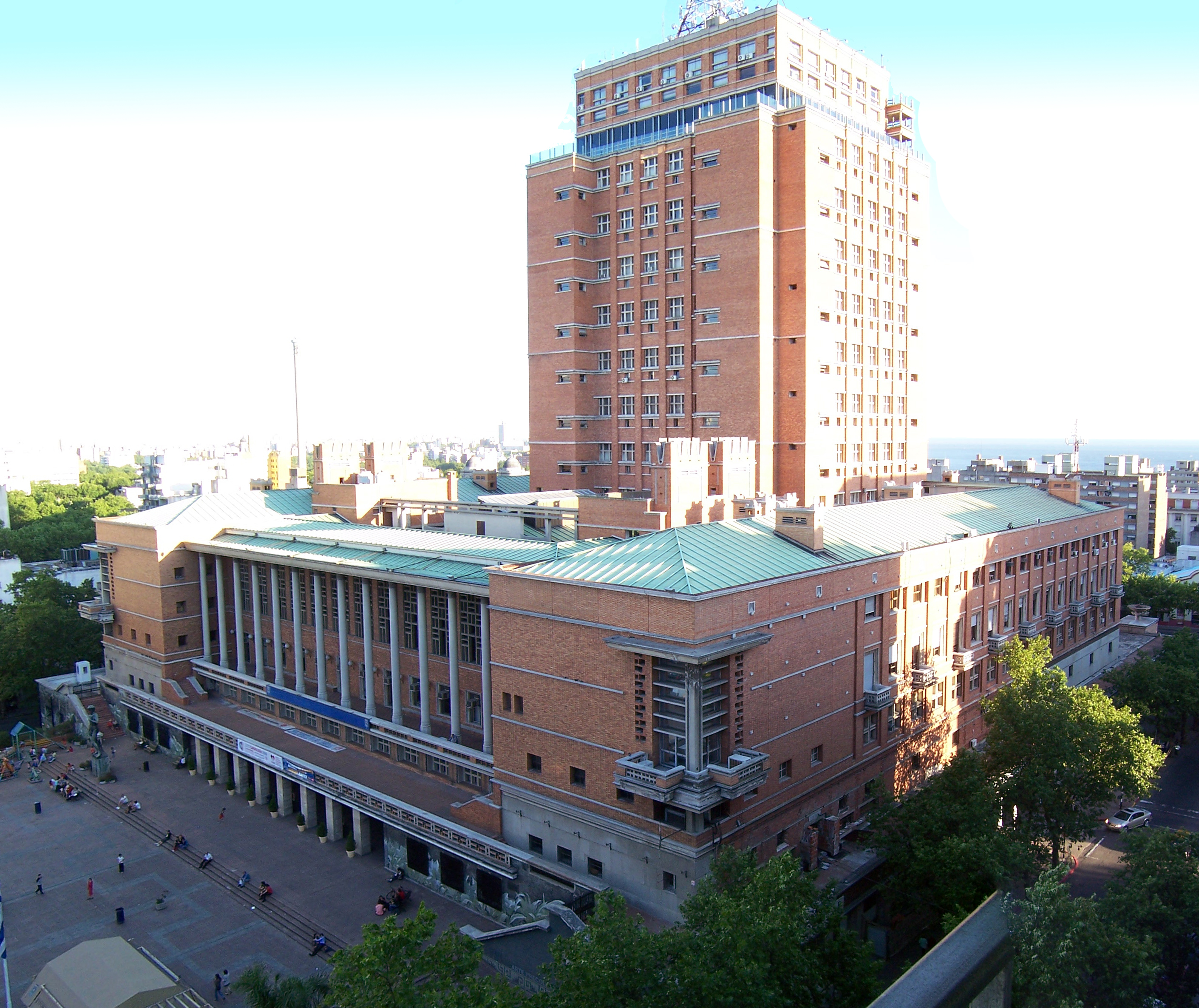
- Interactive map of the Palacio Municipal area

General information
- Type: City administrative building
- Location: 18 de Julio Avenue, Centro, Montevideo, Uruguay
- Coordinates: 34°54′20″S 56°11′3″W
- Current tenants: Intendancy of Montevideo
- Groundbreaking: 1935
- Completed: 1941
- Inaugurated: July 16, 1941

Height
- Height: 78 m (256 ft)

Design and construction
- Architect: Mauricio Cravotto

The Palacio Municipal de Montevideo (City Hall of Montevideo) is the seat of Montevideo government, located on 18 de Julio Avenue, in Central Montevideo. It was designed by Uruguayan architect Mauricio Cravotto.

In the 1930s, a tender was called for the construction of a building to house the then executive and legislative bodies of Montevideo, the Board of Directors, and the Representative Assembly, although with the constitutional reforms these original institutions would be modified. It had to be built on the old property of the English Cemetery, a property acquired several years ago by the state in which it was originally intended to build a building to house the Executive branch of the government and the Judiciary. The City Hall esplanade constitutes a busy meeting place, and is where relevant events such as the matches of the Uruguayan national football team are broadcast on a big screen located in the building opposite.

== History ==
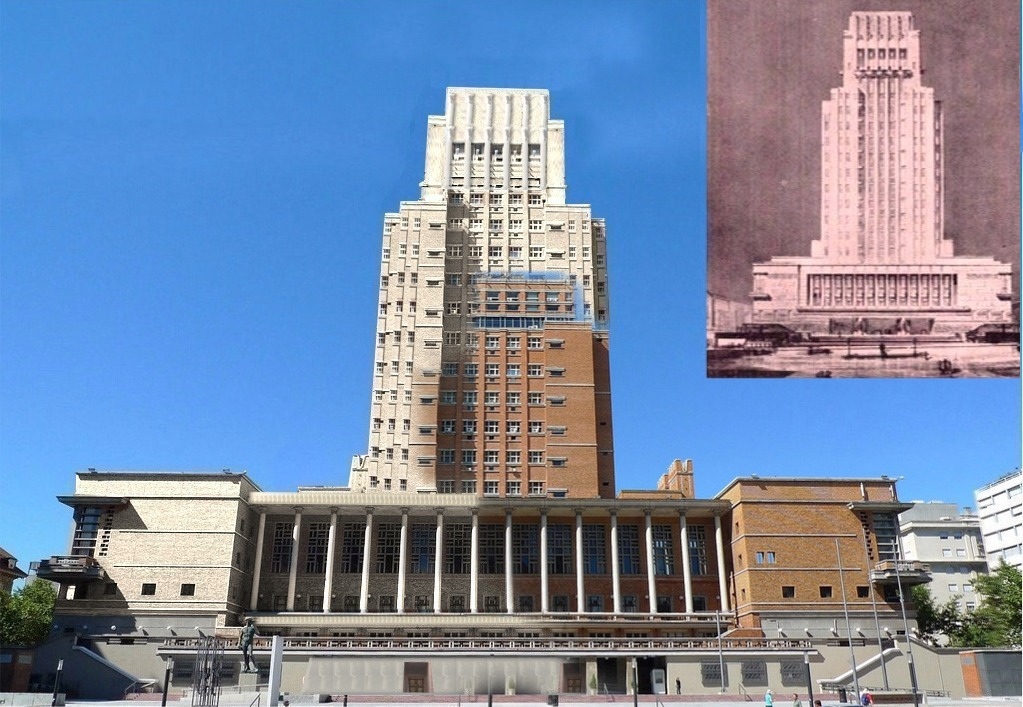
Virtual recreation of Cravotto's original project.

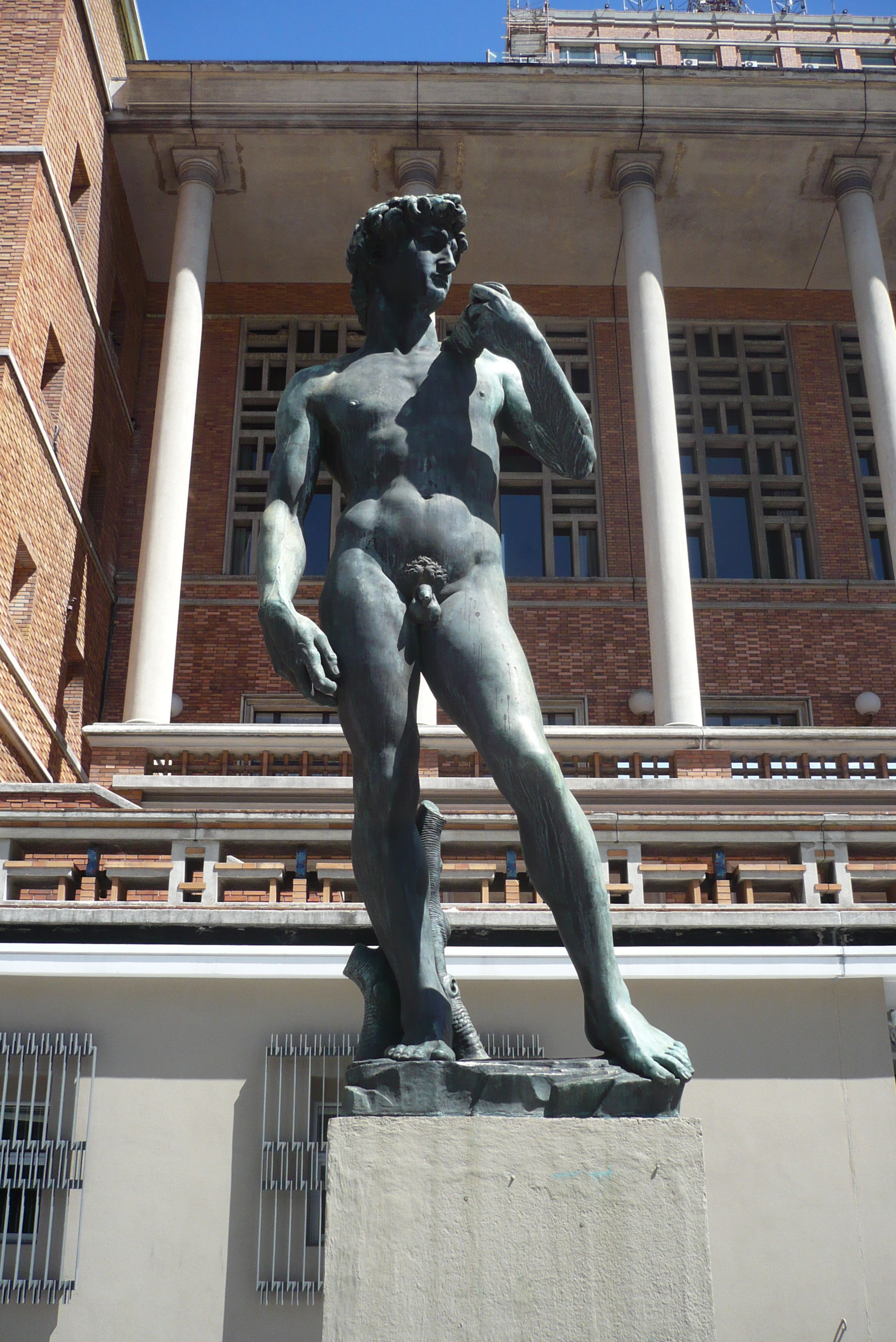
David statue

Construction began in 1935 and was inaugurated on July 16, 1941, although the actual building differs from the original 1929 Cravotto model; his main tower measured 114m, which would have become the tallest building in the city, for financial reasons rose to only 78m, remaining in second place after the Palacio Salvo. It also lacked the brick siding. The side wings, the underground concourse, and the garage were built later, giving the building its current appearance. While not the tallest building in Montevideo, its location on 18 de Julio Avenue, built on the crest of a ridge or long hill, makes the building look more impressive. The area of the building had begun development in at least 1867.

In front of the main entrance is an impressive bronze replica of David of Michelangelo. The atrium of the building hosts exhibitions of art, craft, and varied cultural expressions, while on the right side there is a copy of the statue of Nike of Samothrace. In the late 1980s the hall hosted a retrospective of the work of the ceramicist Eva Díaz Torres.

The west wing of the building hosts the Museum of History of Art. The Municipal centre of Photography includes the Photographic Archive of Montevideo, which is a service where the public can acquire copies from the material of the archive. On the back side of the building, there is an external elevator taking the public to floor 22 of the building where there is a city observatory. Also on the back of the building is the Direccion de Necropolis which supervises the cemeteries of the city.

== Gallery ==
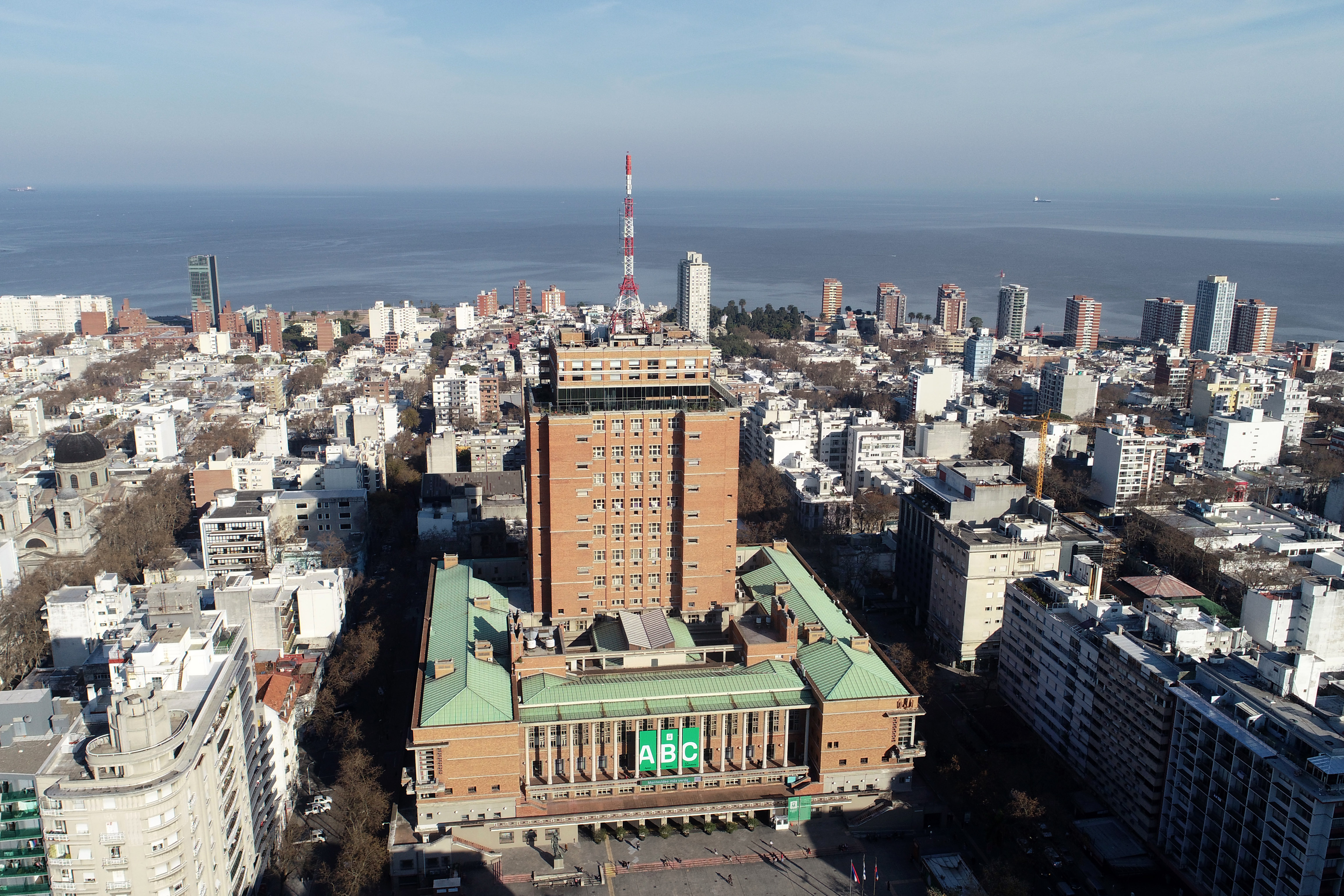
Aerial view of the City Hall.

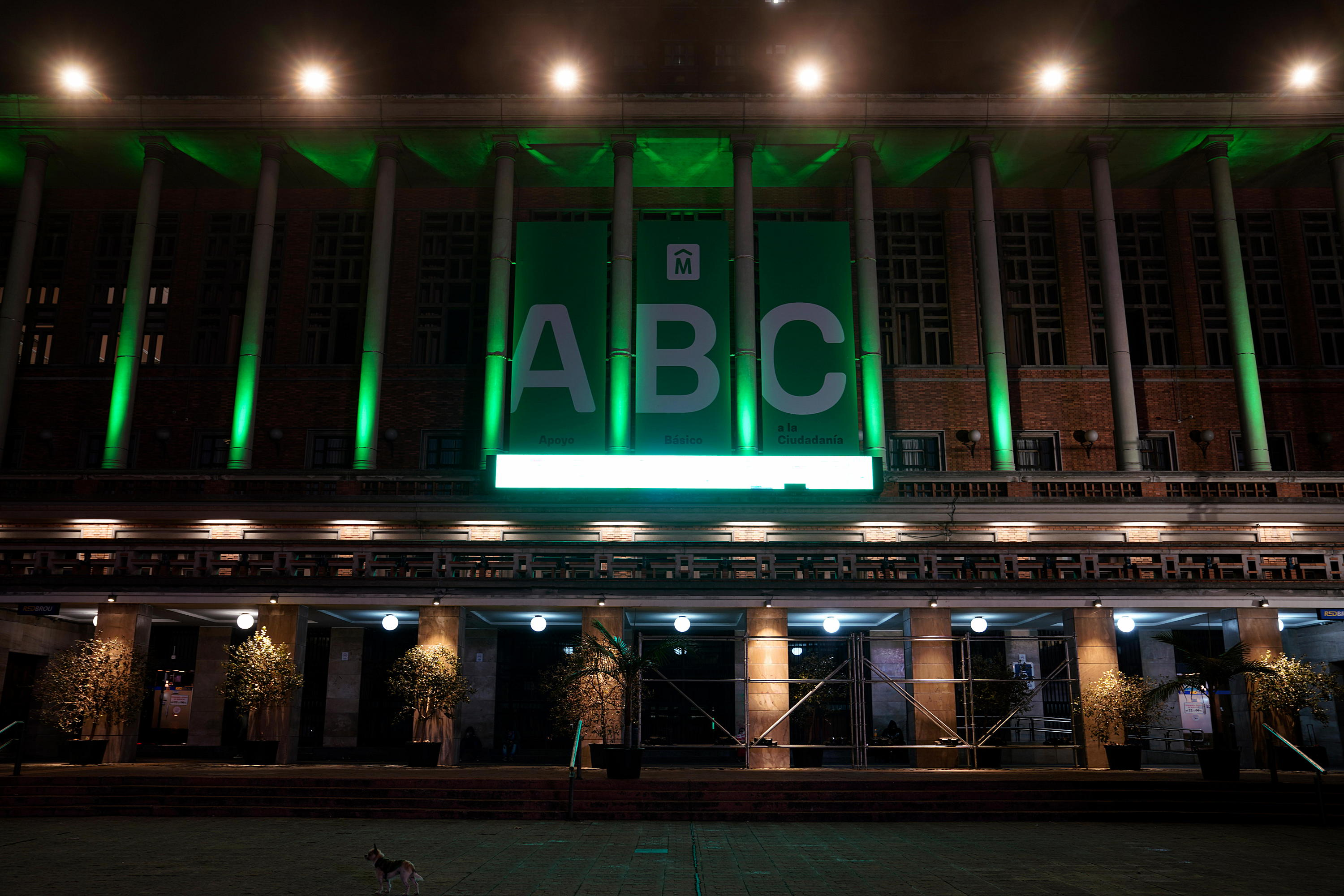
City Hall illuminated in the framework of the Environment Month.

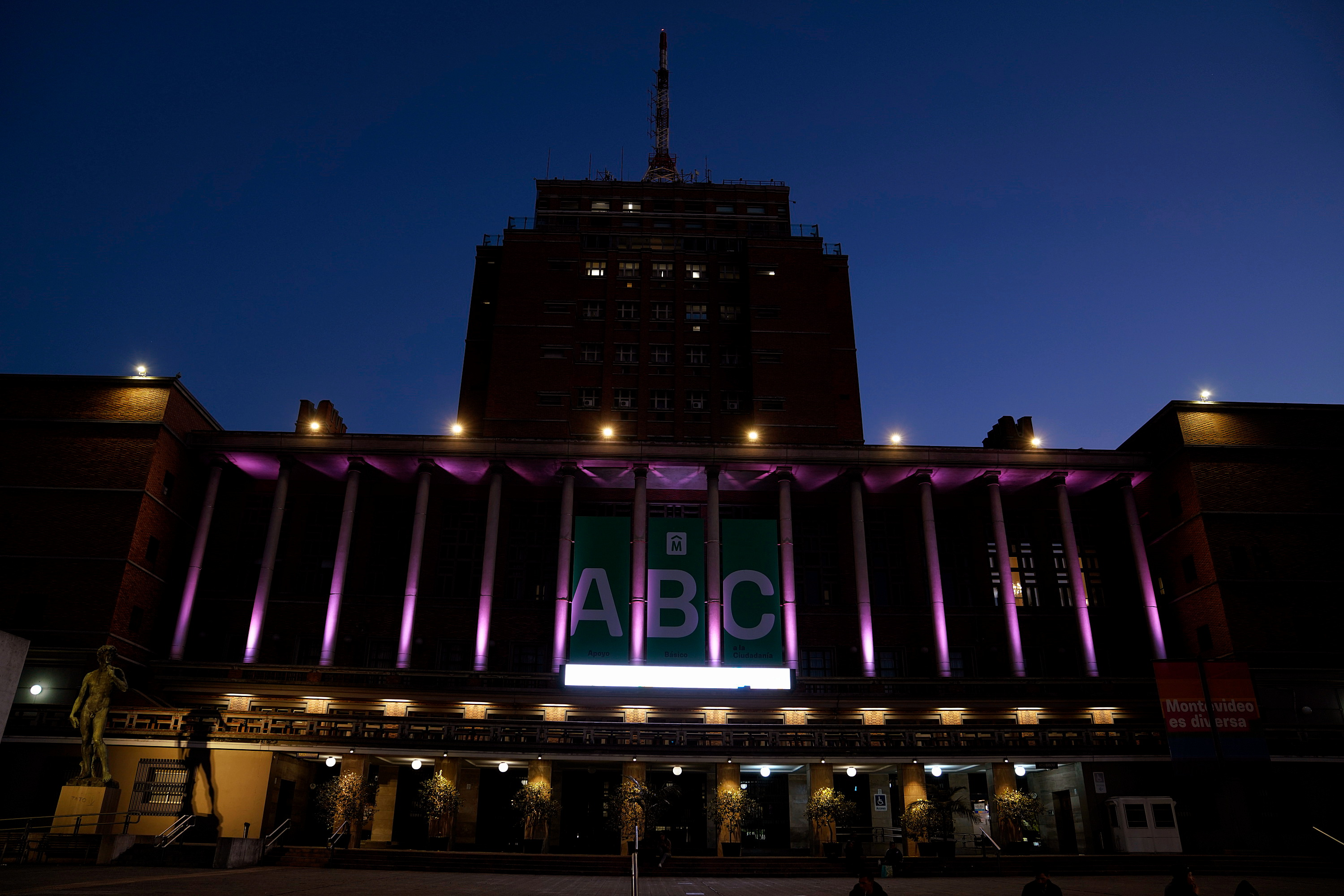
City Hall illuminated for breast cancer prevention month.

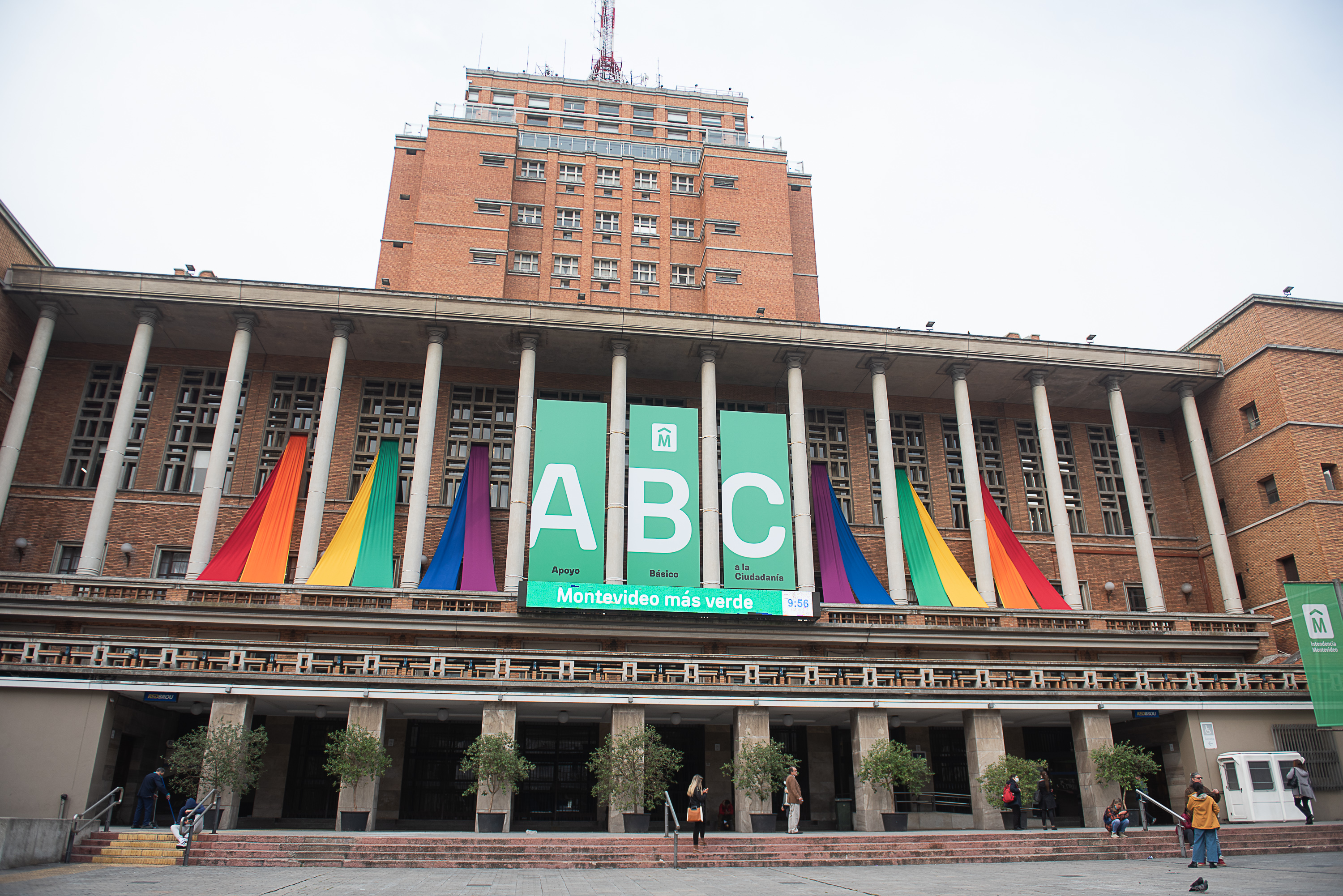
City Hall with colors of the pride month

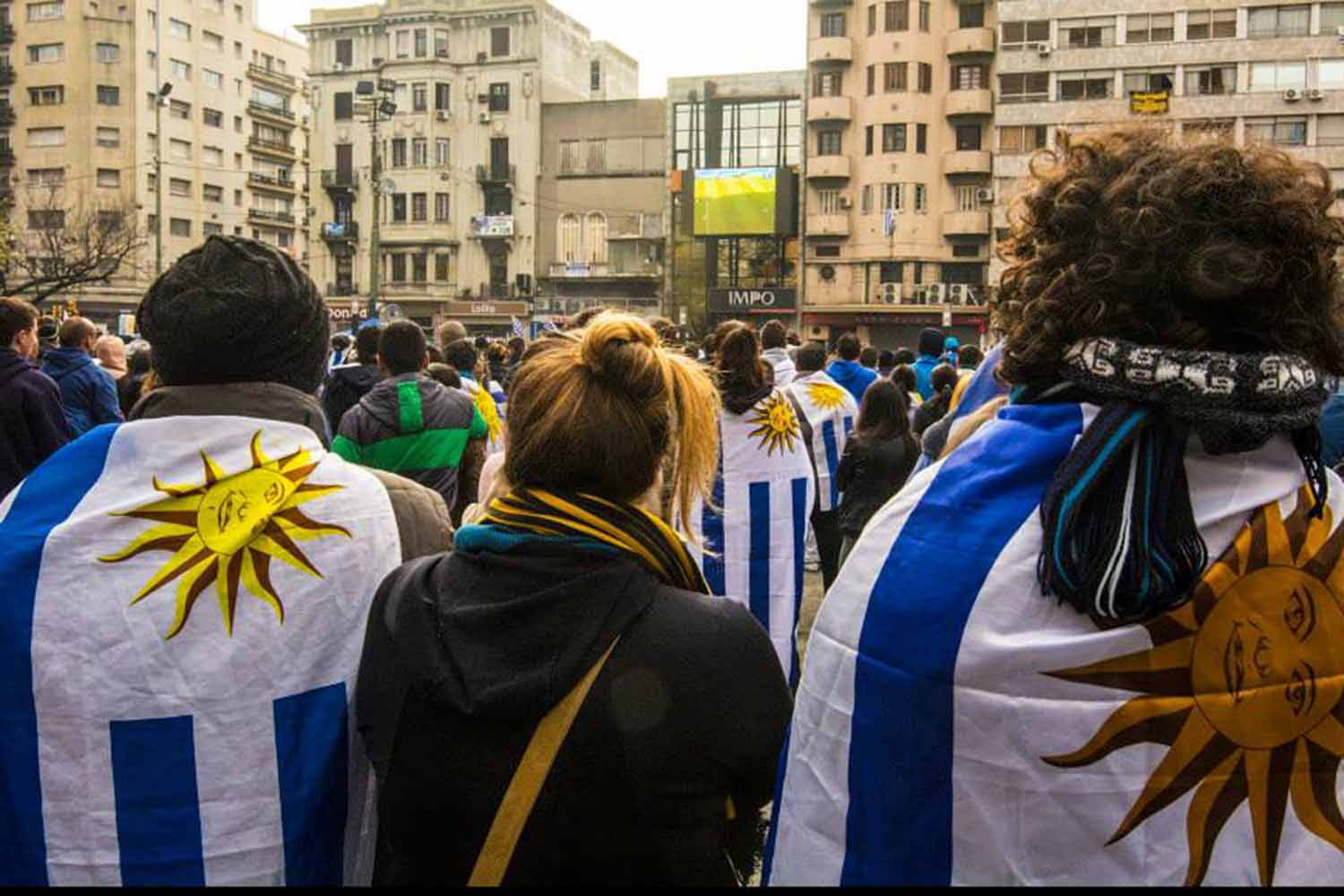
Fans of the national football team on the esplanade of the building watching a game on a big screen
