= William Rey Ashfield =

Uruguayan architect and architectural historian

William Rey Ashfield (born 11 March 1959 in Montevideo) is a Uruguayan architect and architectural historian.

== Career ==
Graduated from the University of the Republic (UdelaR) in 1992, he also attended the Pablo de Olavide University in Spain, where he achieved the Magister in instruments for the assessment and management of the artistic heritage and afterwards a PhD in Art History and Cultural Heritage Management.

He is a professor at the Faculty of Architecture of the UdelaR and also at the University of Montevideo. Several of his articles can be found in university publications in Uruguay, Argentina, Chile, Belgium, Spain, Mexico, resulting of various investigations in the fields of urban history, architecture and cultural heritage.

Together with his colleague Juan Miguel Azadian he has built sports venues and housing. Further, they worked on historical buildings, such as Quinta Capurro in Santa Lucía, Estancia San Pedro de Timote in Florida Department, Molino de Pérez, and Casa Quinta de Aurelio Berro in Montevideo.

In 2020-2025 he chaired the Committee on the National Artistic and Cultural Heritage.

== Selected works ==
- Arquitectura moderna en Montevideo (1920-1960) (in Spanish). Montevideo: Facultad de Arquitectura. 2012.
- Arte y patrimonio en España y América (in Spanish). Montevideo: Universidad de la República et al. 2014. ISBN 978-9974-0-1049-9. (with María de los Ángeles Fernández Valle and Francisco Ollero Lobato)
