= Mauricio Cravotto =

Mauricio Cravotto (Montevideo, September 26, 1893 - October 14, 1962) was a Uruguayan architect, considered one of the founders of urbanism in Uruguay.

== Biography ==
He graduated as an architect at the School of Architecture at the Universidad de la República in 1917. He developed, with leading a team of technicians, the Regulatory Plan of Montevideo (Plan Regulador de Montevideo) of 1930, which never materialized. His works include the Montevideo Rowing Club, the City hall (1935-1941)and the Hotel Rambla (1936).

He won the competition for the master plan for the city of Mendoza, Argentina in 1941, the same year the city hall of Montevideo was completed.

His son Antonio was also an important architect.
