= Juan Antonio Scasso =

Uruguayan architect and urbanist

Juan Antonio Scasso (14 January 1892 - 2 October 1973) was a Uruguayan architect and urbanist.

He was also an association football leader at C.A. Peñarol, of which he was chairman.

== Works ==
- Escuela Experimental de Malvín (1927)
- Estadio Centenario (1930)
- Hotel Miramar (1935)
- Urban expansion of La Paloma, Rocha (1946)
