= Cordón =

- Barrio
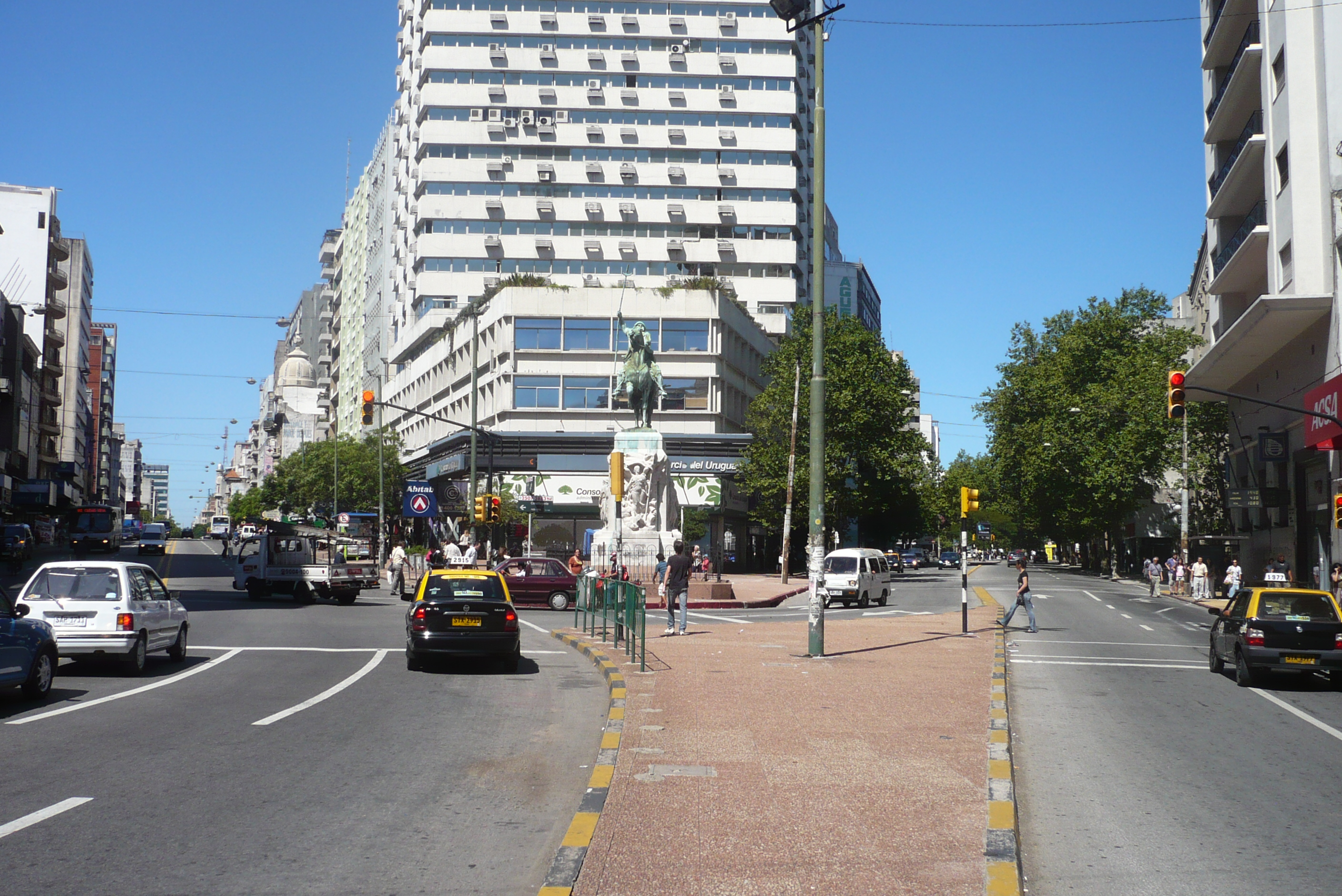
- Monument to the Gaucho and behind the Gaucho Tower

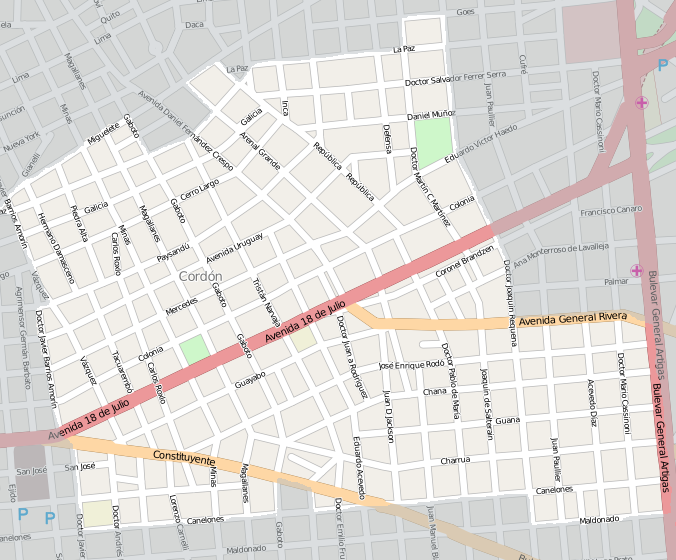
- Street map of Cordón

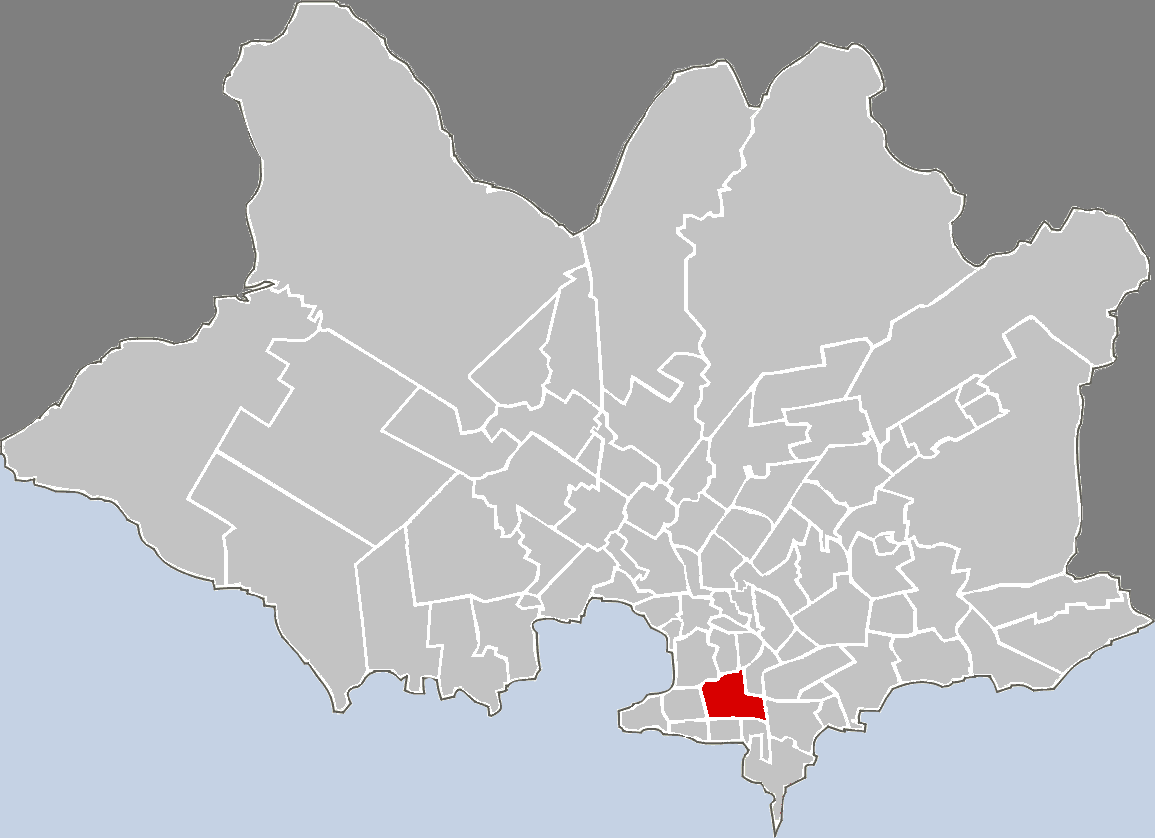
- Location of Cordón in Montevideo
- Coordinates: 34°54′0″S 56°10′50″W
- Country: Uruguay
- Department: Montevideo Department
- City: Montevideo

Cordón is a central barrio (neighbourhood or district) of Montevideo, Uruguay. Part of the city's central business district, alongside Centro and Ciudad Vieja, the 18 de Julio Avenue that runs through the area is home to commercial spaces, office buildings, entertainment venues, and educational centers.

== History ==
Cordón was the first neighborhood to be created outside the walls of the old Citadel of Montevideo. In its origins it was known as "El Cardal", because thistles (Spanish: Cardos) grew in the fields dedicated to the cultivation of corn. It was a large vacant lot that extended to the other side of the wall, behind the "Ejidos", that is, after the area of open land that was used for the defense of the Citadel.

In 1765 the Spanish Crown ordered Bartolomé Mitre Martínez to delineate approximately 60 blocks for population. The area to the east of the demarcation was called "Cordón", from which the name of the neighborhood comes, because the land marking work was carried out using laces (Spanish: Cordones). In January 1807 the entire area was the scene of the Battle of Cardal in the framework of the second British invasion of the River Plate.

In 1892, the once English Cemetery located between 18 de Julio Avenue and Ejido, Santiago de Chile and Soriano streets was replaced by a parade ground, which in the 1950s became Montevideo City Hall, the current seat of the municipal government.

== Geography ==
Cordón is located to the east of Centro, so it is part of the central business district. To the northeast is Tres Cruces and to the east Pocitos. To the north are Aguada and Villa Muñoz, while to the south are Palermo and Parque Rodó.

== Landmarks ==
On 18 de Julio Avenue is the Plaza de los Treinta y Tres, commonly known as Plaza de los Bomberos, because the Centennial Fire Department is located in front of it. In the square there is a monument to the Thirty-Three Orientals, copy of a painting by national painter Juan Manuel Blanes on painted ceramic tiles, a bronze mounted statue of Juan Antonio Lavalleja, the monument to a fireman holding a baby, as well as a bronze statue of Albert Einstein discussing with the Uruguayan philosopher Carlos Vaz Ferreira, both seated on a bench.

Cordón is home to different buildings of architectural importance, such as the National Library, the University of the Republic, the Alfredo Vásquez Acevedo Institute and the headquarters of the Banco de Previsión Social.

The Feria de Tristán Narvaja is a Sunday street market opened in 1909, which has become a tourist attraction.

== Cordón Soho ==
Since the mid-2010s, the area of the neighborhood with its epicenter on Bulevar España between Eduardo Acevedo and Pablo de María streets, has been the location of numerous breweries, bars, boutique restaurants, cafes, and nightclubs, as well as clothing stores and design. It was called Cordon Soho, in reference to the famous SoHo in New York.

== Educational facilities ==
- Colegio Seminario (private, Roman Catholic, Society of Jesus)
- Colegio Nacional José Pedro Varela (private, secular)
- John XXIII Institute (private, Roman Catholic, Salesians of Don Bosco)

== Places of worship ==
There are some important places of worship at this neighbourhood:

- Our Lady of Mt. Carmel, popularly known as "Iglesia del Cordón" (Roman Catholic)
- Church of the Sacred Heart, popularly known as "El Seminario" (Roman Catholic, Jesuits)
- Church of Our Lady of the Rosary and St. Dominic, also known as "Los Domínicos" (Roman Catholic, Dominicans)

== Cultural references ==
- The 2014 novel Cordón Soho by Natalia Mardero is set in this neighbourhood.

== See also ==
- Barrios of Montevideo
