= Alfredo Vásquez Acevedo Institute =

- Instituto Alfredo Vásquez Acevedo
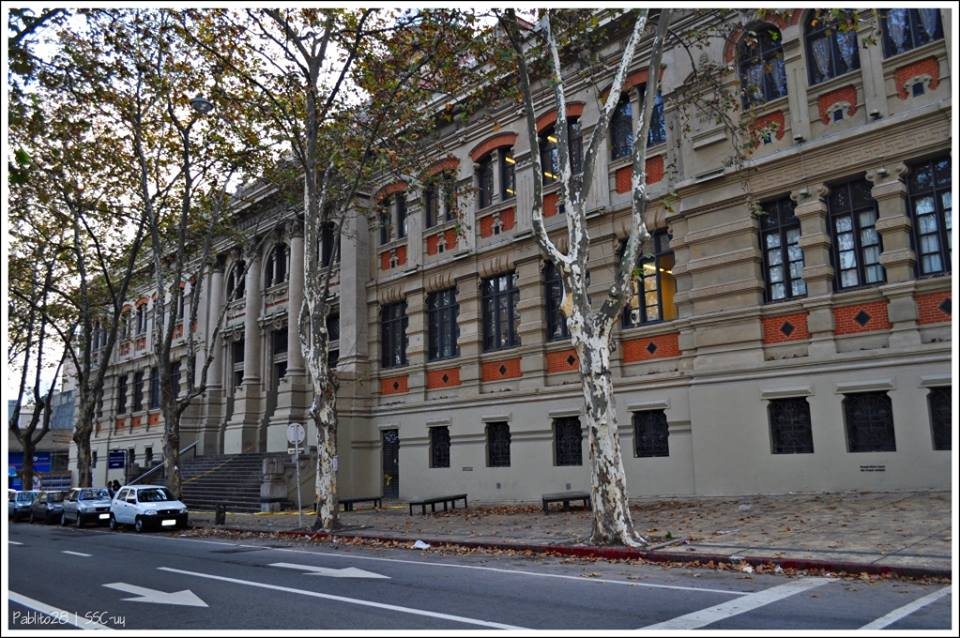

Location
- 1875 José Enrique Rodó St. Cordón, Montevideo; Uruguay; 34.9037°S 56.1759°W

Information
- Other name: Liceo No. 35 de Montevideo
- Type: Public secondary
- Established: 1911
- Founder: Claudio Williman
- Gender: Coeducational
- Enrollment: 1530
- Nickname: IAVA
- Website: iava.edu.uy

The Instituto Alfredo Vásquez Acevedo (IAVA; Alfredo Vásquez Acevedo Institute) is a public high school in Montevideo, Uruguay. Identified as Liceo No. 35 of Montevideo, it was named in honor of the jurist and politician Alfredo Vásquez Acevedo.

Housed in an art nouveau style building built in 1911 by the architect Alfredo Jones Brown, the institute has educated a wide range of notable alumni, including presidents and vice presidents.

== History ==
Faculty of Secondary Education (current IAVA) in 1911

The creation of the institute is part of the educational reform carried out by José Pedro Varela since the 1880s. This led to a transformation of primary education, separating the public school from the university.

Around the 1900s the number of secondary school students was increasing dramatically. In 1903, while Claudio Williman served as rector of the University of the Republic, the institution was awarded a property in the Cordón barrio, where the headquarters of the Faculty of Secondary Education (current IAVA) and the Faculty of Law (which would also serve as the university's headquarters) would later be built.

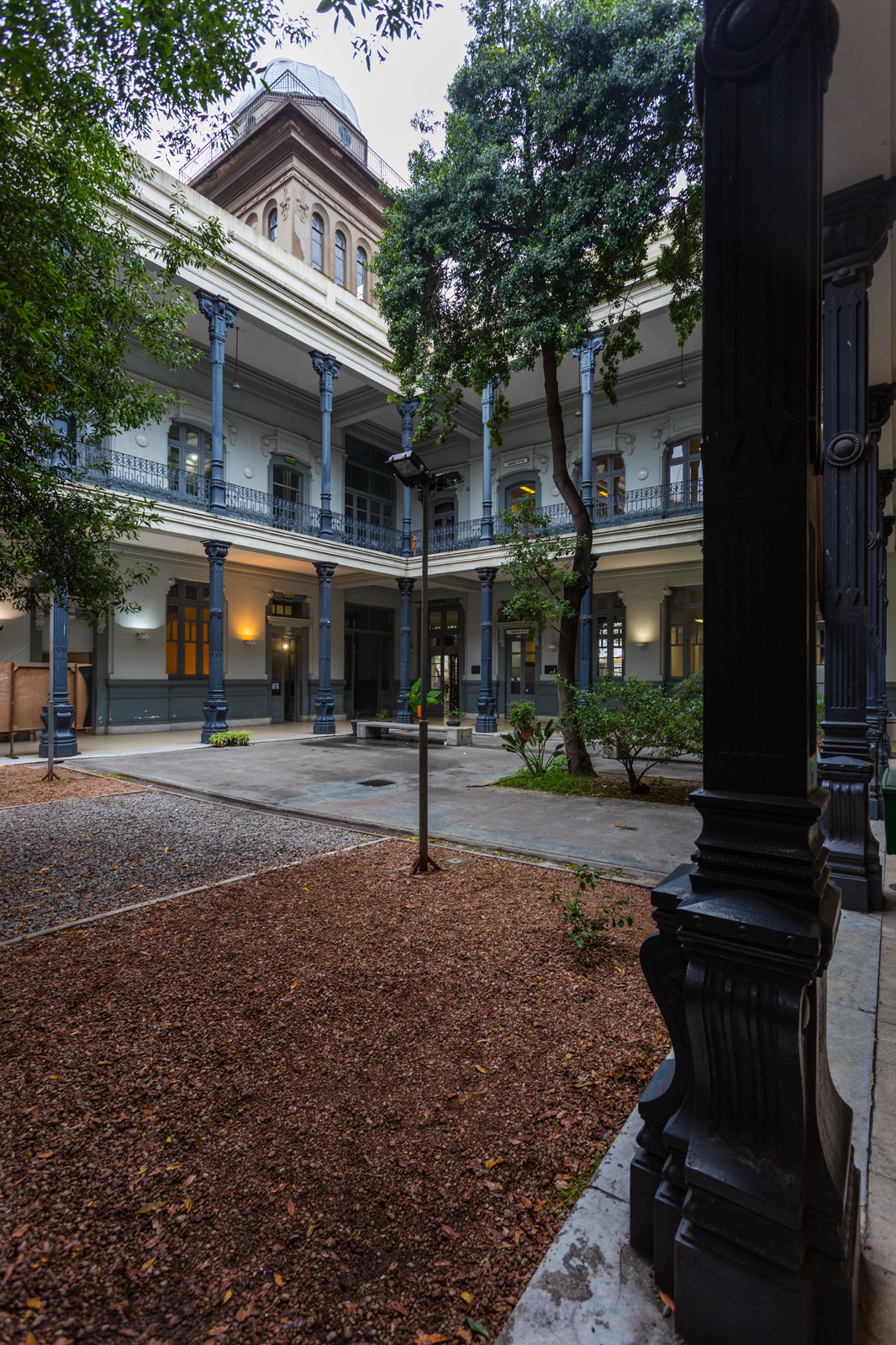
Internal courtyard of the institute

In 1911, what was then known as the Secondary and Preparatory Education Section of the university was inaugurated, being the first of its kind in the country. In the 1930s, secondary education was disaffiliated from the university. In 1940 the IAVA stopped providing the basic cycle of secondary education, becoming a college-preparatory school, proving only the diversified baccalaureate.

In 1976, the building was declared a National Historical Monument. From 2004 to 2009, major renovations were carried out on the building, which included new classrooms, improved laboratories and new doors and windows, as well as a renovation of the main façade. While the works were carried out, part of the institute's normal operations was moved to a neighboring building located on 18 de Julio Avenue.

== Notable people ==
=== Alumni ===
- Jose Luis Massera
- Hugo Batalla
- Jorge Batlle
- Luis Antonio Hierro López
- Ernesto Mordecki
- José Mujica
- Julio María Sanguinetti
- Jorge Sapelli
- Lucía Topolansky
- Tabaré Vázquez

=== Faculty ===
- Benjamín Nahum
- Ángel Rama
- Oscar Secco Ellauri
- Idea Vilariño
