= Sala Zitarrosa =

Concert venue in Montevideo, Uruguay

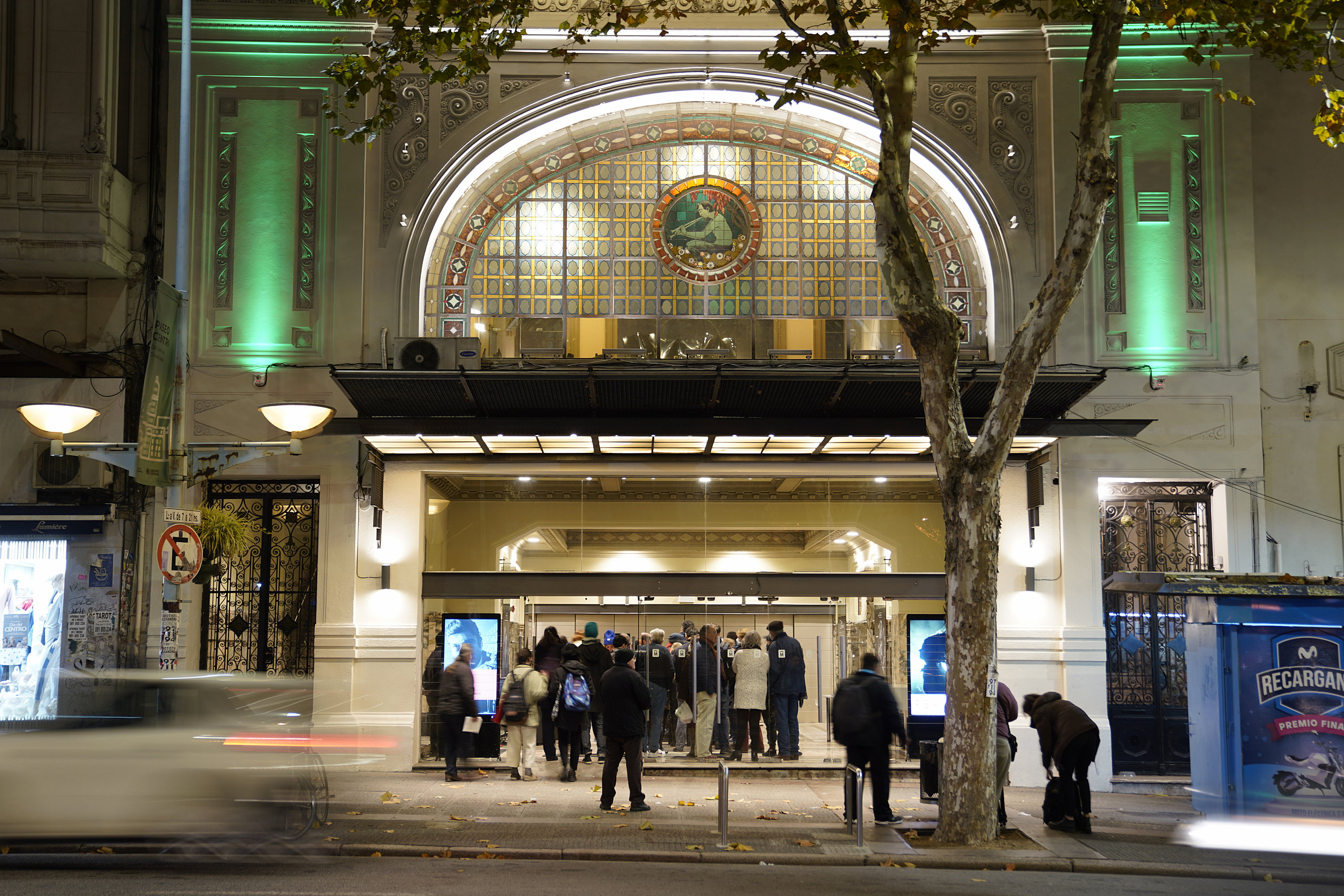
- Sala Zitarrosa in 2022
- Interactive map of Sala Zitarrosa
- Address: 1012 18 de Julio Avenue; Centro, Montevideo; Uruguay
- Owner: Intendancy of Montevideo
- Capacity: 531
- Type: Concert hall

Construction
- Opened: November 3, 1999; 26 years ago
- Architect: Alfredo Jones Brown

Website
- salazitarrosa.montevideo.gub.uy/

Sala Zitarrosa (Spanish for 'Zitarrosa Hall') is a concert hall and theatre in Montevideo, Uruguay. Located in the Rex building, in the city’s downtown area, it is named after the renowned singer-songwriter Alfredo Zitarrosa. The venue occupies the site of the former Cine Rex Theatre, which operated from the 1920s to the 1980s, and hosts concerts, theatrical productions, film screenings, and a variety of cultural events.

== History ==
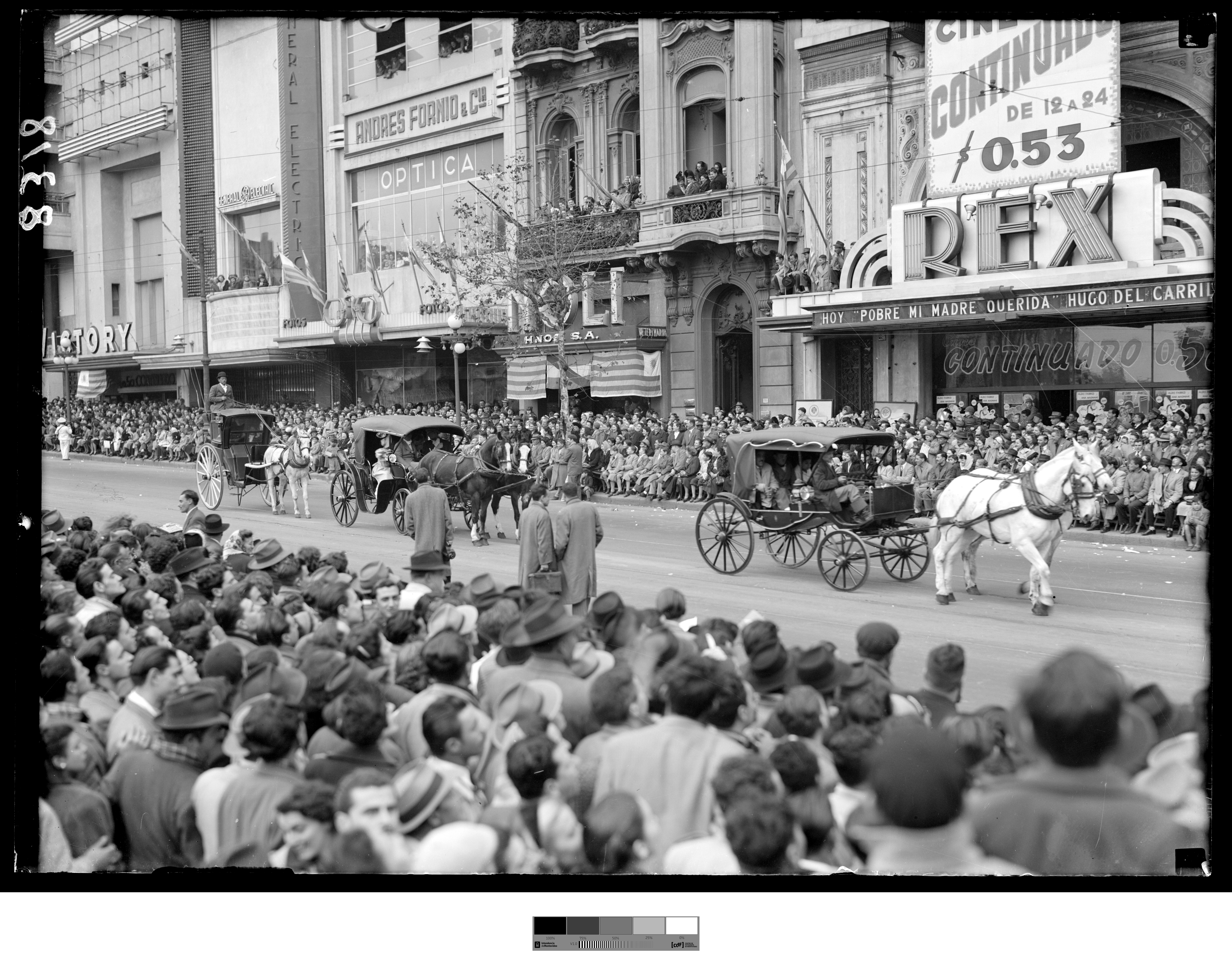
Cine Rex Theatre facade, 1948

Sala Zitarrosa is located on the ground floor of the Rex Building in Downtown Montevideo. The building, designed in an eclectic historicist style with numerous modernist elements, was constructed by architect Alfredo Jones Brown. Upon its completion, the ground floor housed the Cine Rex Theatre, operated by Max Glücksmann’s company. The cinema was one of the first in the country to screen sound films and became one of Montevideo’s most luxurious venues, with a capacity of 850 people and a large stained-glass window that naturally illuminated the first floor.

After a period of decline in the 1980s, the building was acquired by the Intendancy of Montevideo in 1997, which organized a restoration competition won by architect Conrado Pintos. The restoration lasted 18 months and aimed to preserve the original materials, replacing only what was necessary with contemporary elements while maintaining harmony between old and new. The project included the work of Eneida de León, who later served as Minister of Housing. Sala Zitarrosa was inaugurated on 3 November 1999 as a cultural center dedicated to national music.

== Architecture ==
=== Facade ===
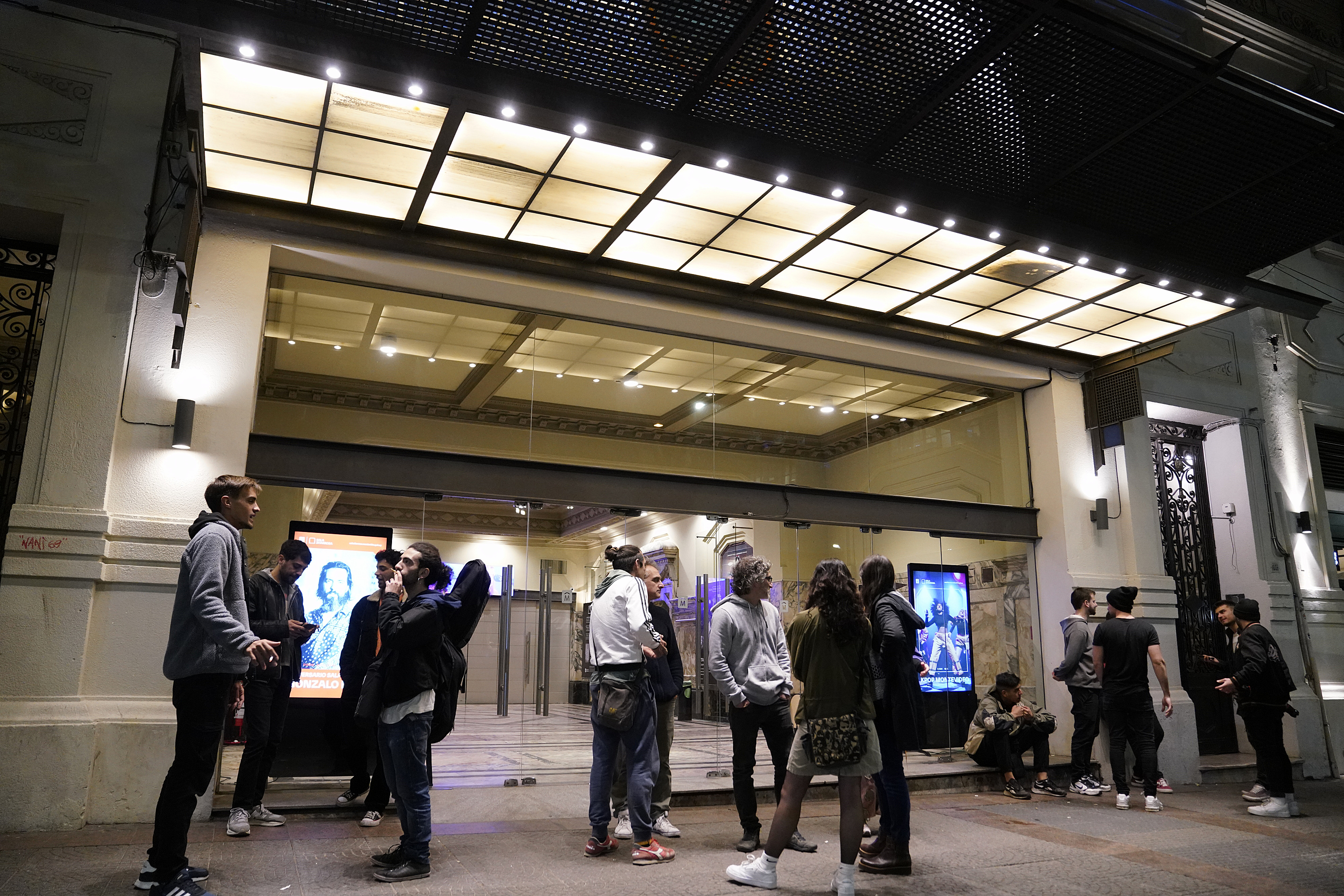
Sala Zitarrosa entrance

Sala Zitarrosa is on the south side of 18 de Julio Avenue, between Julio Herrera y Obes and Río Negro Streets, across from Plaza Fabini. Situated at street level, the venue is slightly set back from the Rex building’s corner with Julio Herrera y Obes Street. Its façade, crowned by a large pointed arch, features a grand stained-glass window depicting the god Pan summoning his flock with a flute, through which the first floor of the hall is naturally illuminated.

Although the former Cine Teatro Rex featured a long marquee sign on its exterior, the current venue has a large glass and black metal canopy in its place, supported by metal tension rods and illuminated. On either side of the entrance are digital screens and displays showing the program schedule.

=== Interior ===
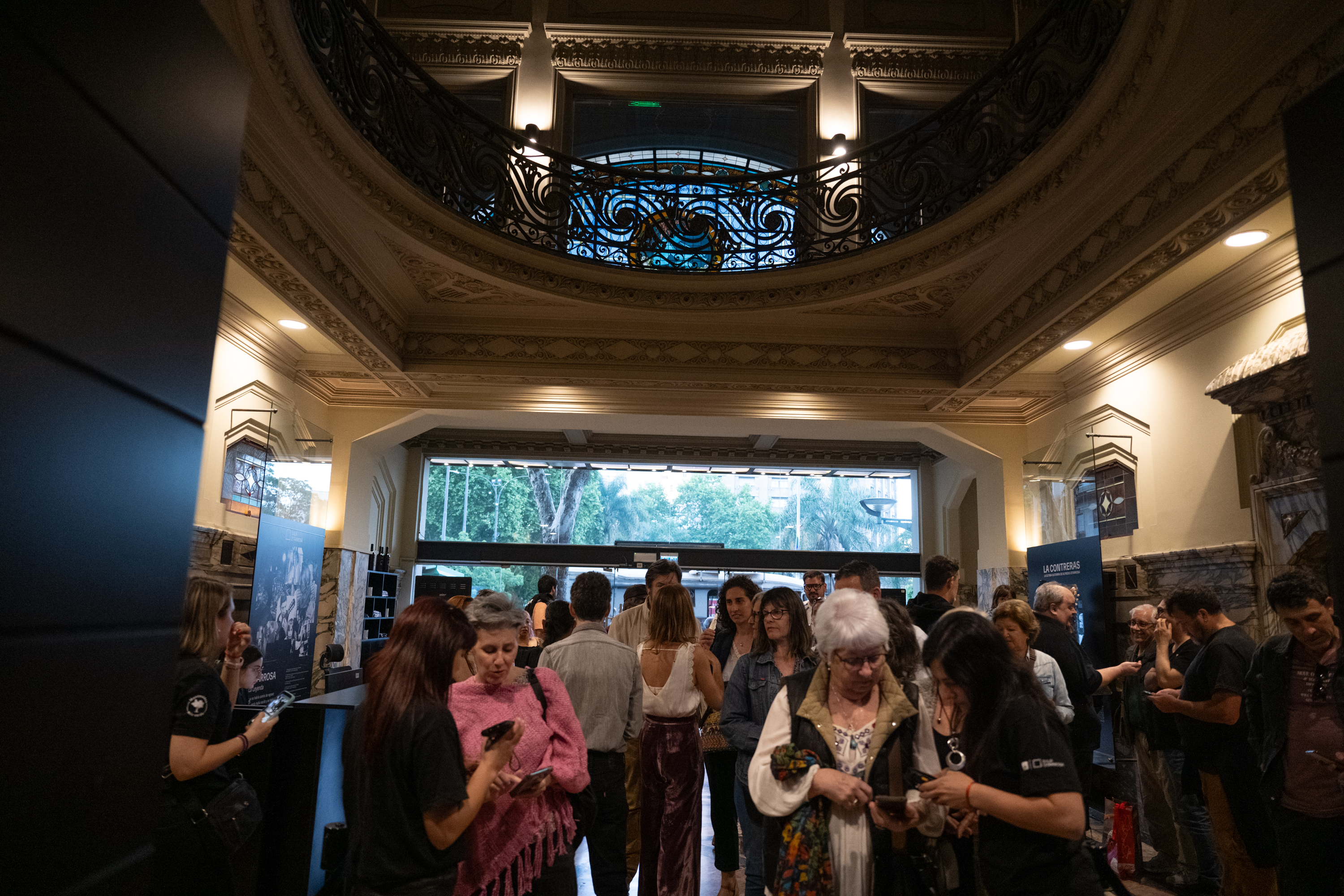
Foyer of the venue

The interior includes a foyer and a large main auditorium. The foyer, partially illuminated by natural light from the façade’s stained-glass window, features moldings and marble from the 1920s, the period of the building’s construction, alongside modern equipment.

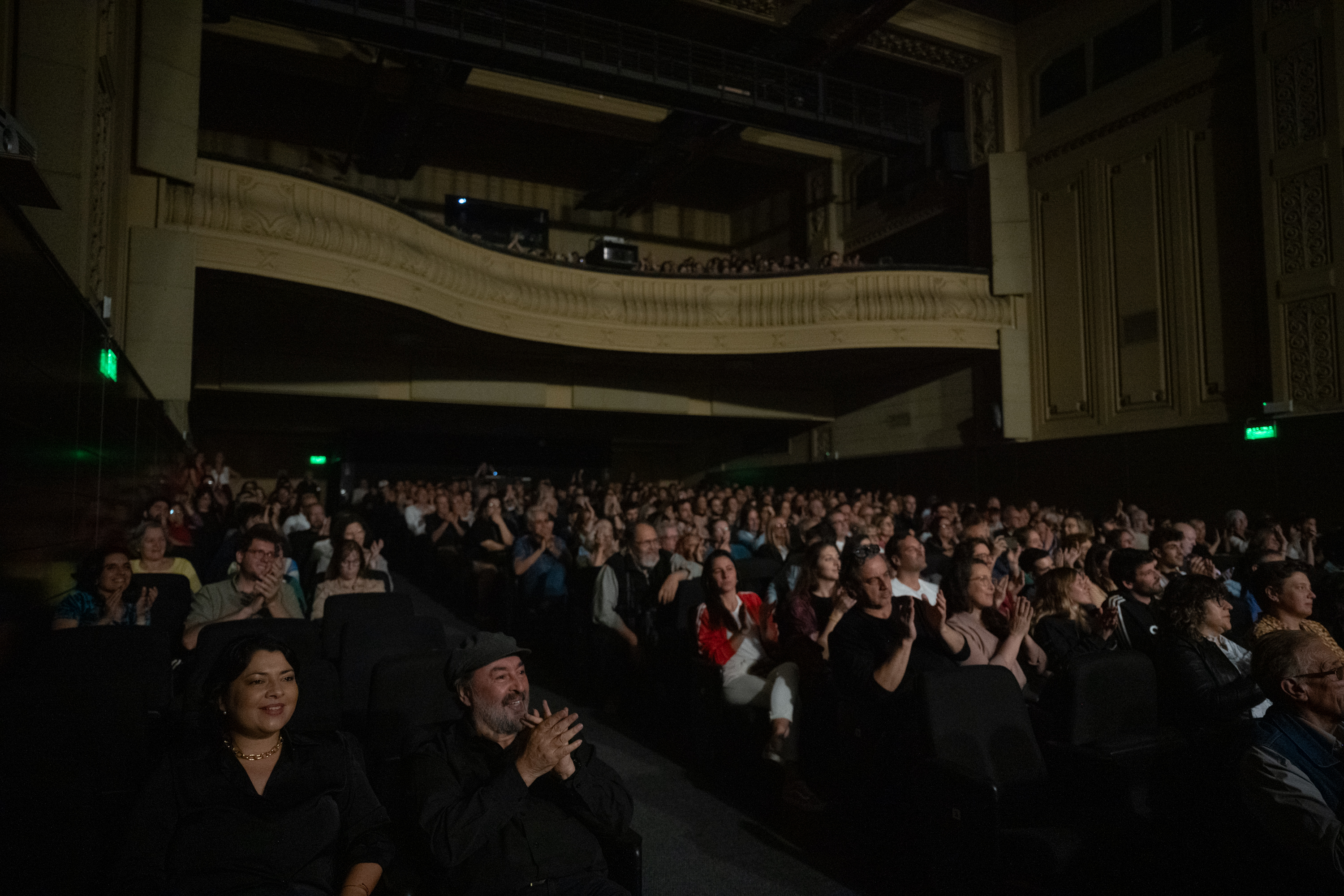
Auditorium of Sala Zitarrosa, 2024

The auditorium has 531 seats. 391 of these are at the stalls, while the remaining 140 are in the gallery. It features a high ceiling divided into panels with geometric moldings. The side walls display a series of vertical pilasters framing rectangular panels. In addition, the large stage remains rectangular, elevated, and framed by an architectural structure.
