= Melogno =

Melogno is a surname. Notable people with the surname include:

- Ángel Melogno (1905–1945), Uruguayan footballer
- Ruben Melogno (1945–2020), Uruguayan singer

== See also ==
- Colle del Melogno, mountain pass in Liguria, Italy
