= La Triple Nelson =

Uruguayan rock group

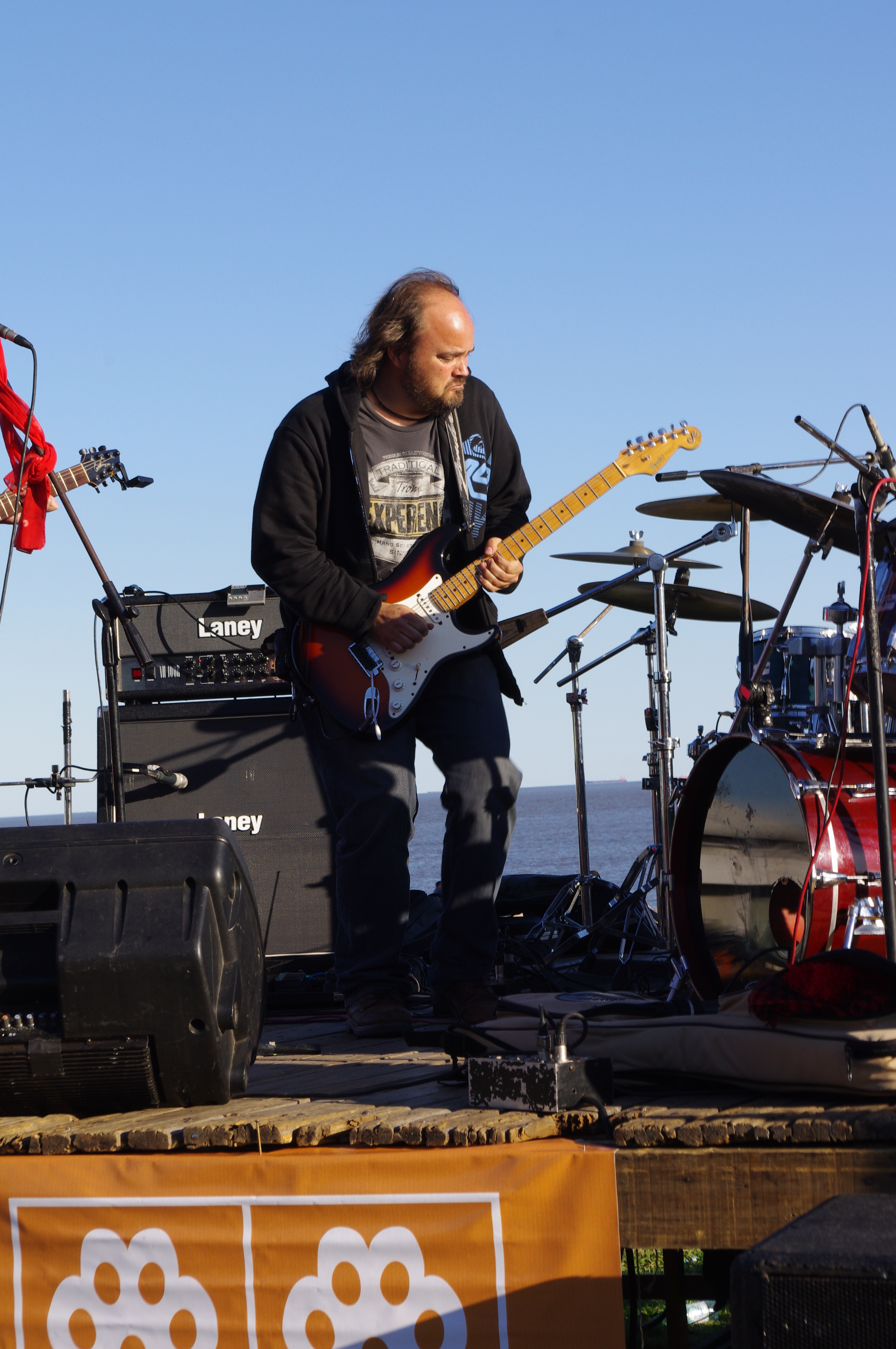
Christian Cary

La Triple Nelson is an Uruguayan rock group formed in January 1998. It is currently made up of Christian Cary (guitar and voice), Fernando "Paco" Pintos (bass and backing vocals) and Rafael Ugo (drums).

== History ==
The first integration of the band was composed by Christian Cary (voice and guitar), Fernando "Paco" Pintos (bass) and Ruben Ottonello (drums). Their first performances took place in Punta del Este in 1998. During the summer season they dedicated themselves to playing versions of songs in rock and blues. After this, they moved to Montevideo.

In 2000 they won the contest "Probandas 2000", organized by Canal 10, with one of their first compositions: the song "Billete".

In 2001, the band recorded their first album "Buceo", recorded with a few hours of studio work in Maldonado and released independently.

In 2002 they made their first recitals abroad, when they toured Peru. Throughout that year, in addition to performing regularly live, they concentrated on the composition of part of the material that would later make up their second CD.

At the beginning of 2003, Rubén Otonello left the band and Marcelo “Mape” Bossio joined to play drums. With this new integration, they traveled to Brazil for a 15-day tour, appearing in 19 shows.

In 2004 the band's second album, "Follow better", recorded at the Ion Studios in Buenos Aires, Argentina, released by the Argentine label Barca. The album had the support of the National Music Fund (FONAM) and was distributed in Uruguay by Bizarro Records. The broadcast cut was "Sin tu angel" and the video for this song was filmed in July 2004, directed by Santiago Paiz. It was presented in August of the same year at the Sala Zitarrosa and obtained great approval from both the public and the press. As of the publication of this album, they began to appear in Buenos Aires. The album was nominated in 2005 at the Graffiti Awards for best album.

The year 2005 was very important for the band from the point of view of popularity. He won the audience's Graffiti award for best artist.5 In addition, they performed recitals on more important stages, both individually, as a guest of international bands (Divididos, Memphis la Blusera) or in massive recitals (Pilsen Rock, Fiesta X).

In 2006 they released their third album, by Bizarro Records, entitled "Tres". The album was presented at the Cine Plaza.

In 2008, their first live album was released, "Un mucho de vivos", recorded a year earlier at the Movie Center Montevideo room. The album received two Graffiti Awards in 2009, for best live album and best blues album.

In October 2008 Marcelo “Mape” Bossio retired from the band and Guillermo Vila joined in his place. At the end of December 2009, they announced their retirement and their current drummer Rafael Ugo entered.

In 2010 they released a new album, "Caos natural", which was winner of the 2011 Graffiti award for best rock album. With this album they were once again broadcast in Argentina, performing in 2011 a series of recitals in that country.

At the end of 2010 they presented a show with the Montevideo Philharmonic Orchestra at the Montevideo Summer Theater. This show was repeated on several occasions, one of them in February 2011 at the Solis Theater, when the album "Ciento 3" was recorded (released on CD and DVD format). This album won the 2012 Graffiti Awards for Best Music DVD and Best Music Album, as well as being nominated for Album of the Year.

In 2012 they released their fifth studio album, "Agua y sal", winner of the 2013 Graffiti award for best rock album.

As of 2013, the trio began to perform live as a quartet with the incorporation of Ignacio Labrada on keyboards, who was later replaced by Manuel Contrera. While the presence of a keyboard player became constant, both in live performances and on records, they have always been featured as guest musicians.

In 2014 they recorded their third live album, within the framework of AGADU's "Autores en Vivo" cycle. The album was titled "Electro acústica mente". The album was nominated in 2015 for Graffiti Awards for Best Music DVD and Best Live Album.

In 2015 they released a new studio album, called "La sed". It won in 2016 the Graffiti award for best rock and blues album, in addition, the band was recognized that year with best band.

In September 2016, celebrating their 18 years, they performed at the Solís Theater. This show was recorded, leading to a double album, released in 2018 under the title "20 años". To celebrate their 20 years, they did a series of three recitals on that same stage in May 2018, with the presence of the legendary Ruben Melogno.

Continuing with their growth in Argentina, they participated in Cosquín Rock in 2016 and held a show in La Trastienda in 2018.

== Discography ==
- Buceo (Independent, 2001)
- Seguir mejor (Barca discos, 2004)
- Tres (Koala Records, 2006)
- Un montón de vivos (Montevideo Music Group, 2008)
- Caos natural (Montevideo Music Group, 2010)
- Ciento 3 (CD y DVD, Montevideo Music Group, 2011)
- Agua y Sal (Montevideo Music Group, 2012)
- Electro Acústica Mente (CD y DVD, Montevideo Music Group, 2014)
- La Sed (Montevideo Music Group, 2015)
- 20 años (Montevideo Music Group, 2018)
- Mi Bien (2020)
- Después del último día (Pirca Records(2022)
- De amor, de locura y de guerra (Montevideo Music Group, 2025)
