= Patricia Kramer =

Uruguayan politician (born 1979)

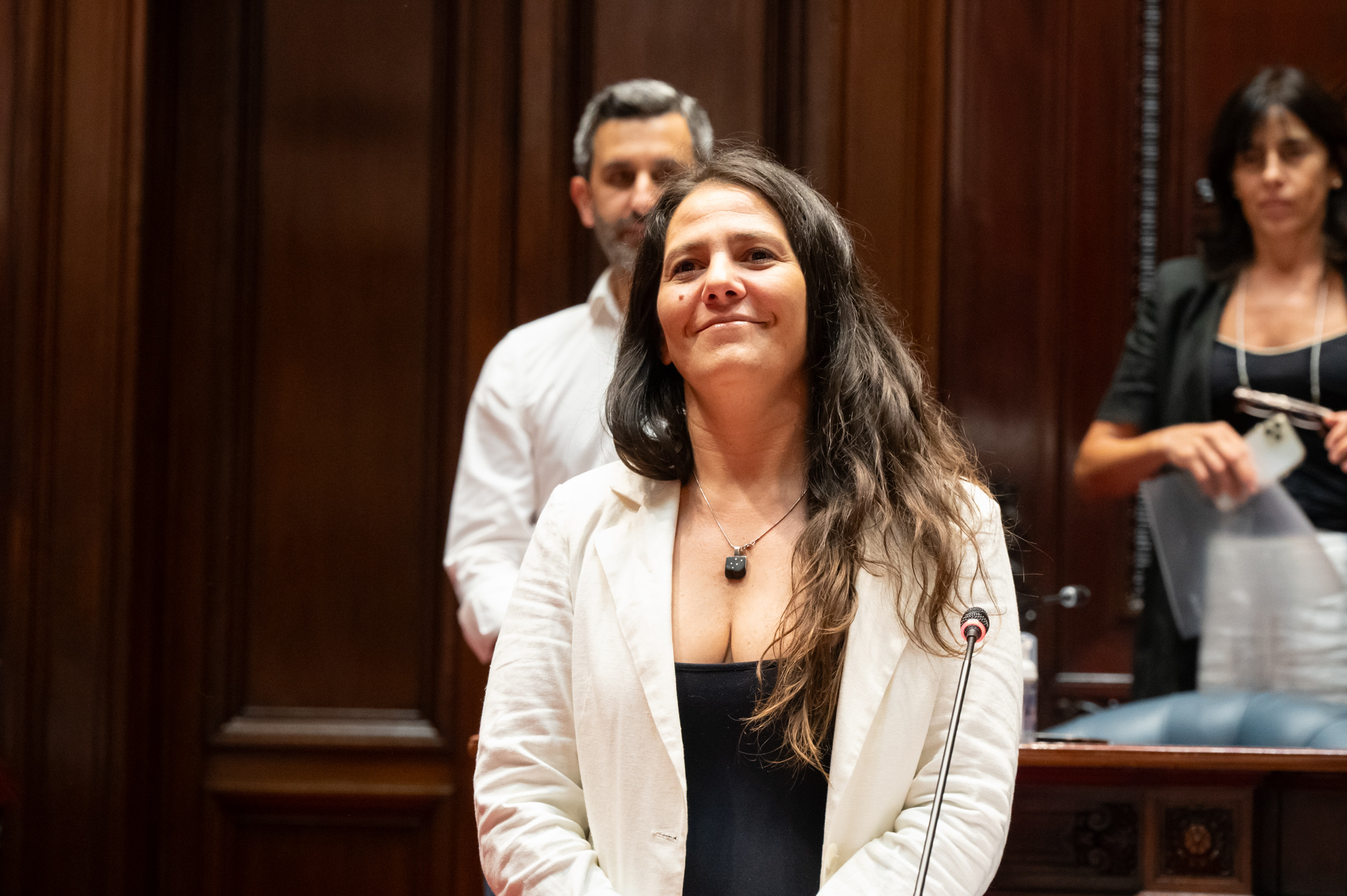
- Kramer in 2025

Senator of the Republic
- Incumbent
- Assumed office March 1, 2025
- Preceded by: Cristina Lustemberg

Personal details
- Born: Patricia Natalia Kramer Belo; 5 September 1979 (age 46) Montevideo, Uruguay
- Party: Broad Front
- Domestic partner: Ana Prada (1999-2021)
- Children: 1

Patricia Natalia Kramer Belo (born September 5, 1979) is a Uruguayan singer-songwriter and politician. A member of the Broad Front, she has served as Senator of the Republic since 2025.

== Early life ==
Kramer was born in Montevideo in 1979, the youngest daughter of a textile company owner father and a homemaker mother. Her father is Jewish. She attended Colegio Nacional José Pedro Varela, and studied for one year for a degree in philosophy, and later for five years at the Faculty of Chemistry of the University of the Republic, but did not graduate. In 2017, she studied sheep breeding at the National Institute of Employment and Vocational Training, and agricultural production at the University of Labor of Uruguay.

== Personal life ==
Kramer is a lesbian. From 1999 to 2021, she was in a relationship with fellow singer Ana Prada. In 2019, they had a son, Hugo.
