= Gaucho Tower =

- Torre del Gaucho
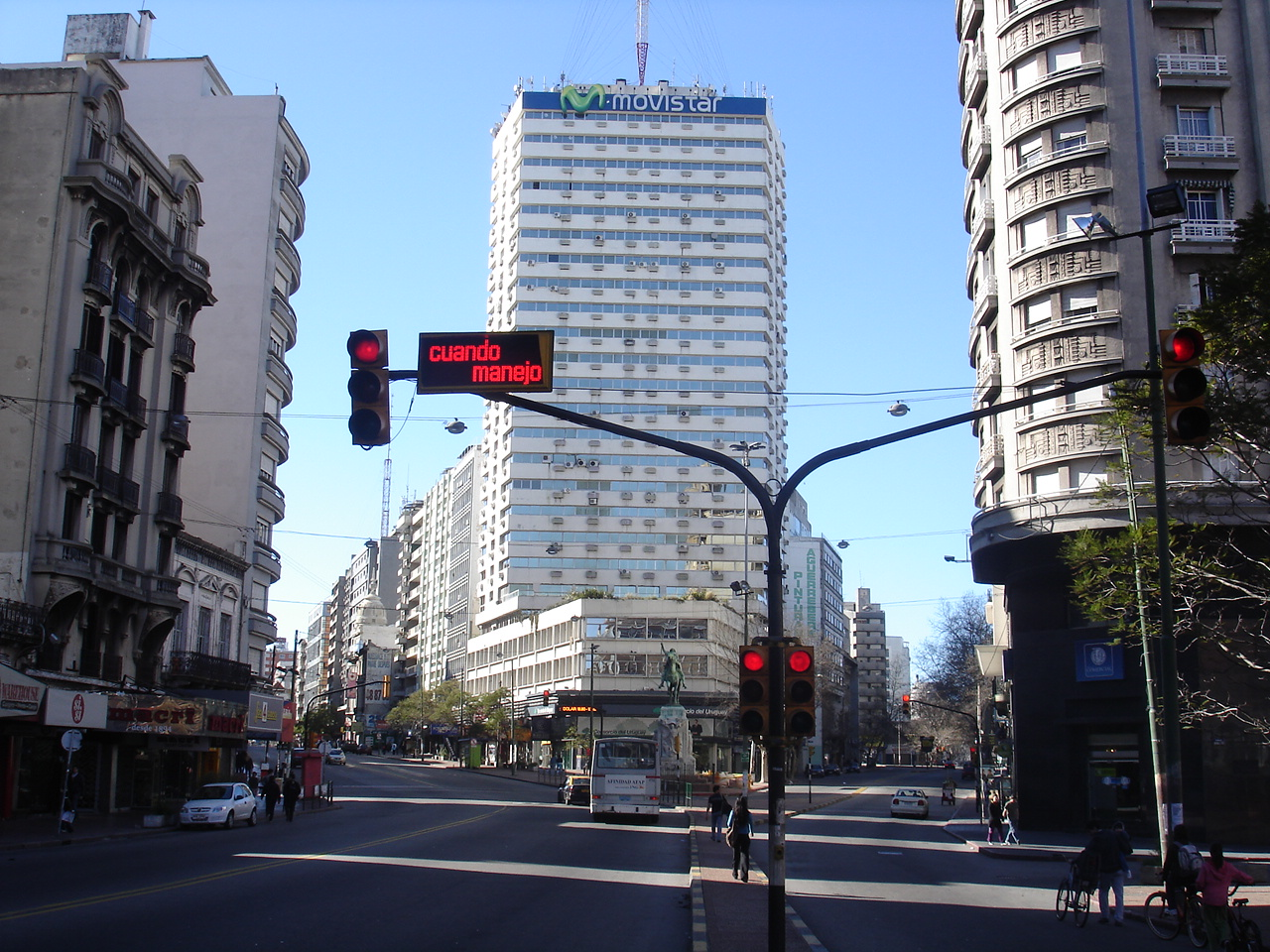
- (July 2008)
- Interactive map of the Gaucho Tower area

General information
- Status: Completed
- Type: Commercial offices
- Location: 1467 Constituyente Avenue; Montevideo, Uruguay
- Completed: 1995
- Height: 95 m (312 ft)

Technical details
- Material: Reinforced concrete
- Floor count: 24

Design and construction
- Architect: Walter Pintos Risso

Gaucho Tower (Spanish: Torre del Gaucho) is a high-rise commercial and office building in the Cordón neighborhood of Montevideo, Uruguay.

It has 24 stories and stands at a height of 95 m (312 ft). Located in the Cordón neighborhood, it has a prominent position in the neighborhood's skyline, standing at the junction of 18 de Julio Avenue, which curves to the northwest, and Constituyente Avenue. In the junction space a monument is erected to the figure of the gaucho, from which the building takes its name. Due to its position, it is seen from Plaza Independencia.

Designed by architect Walter Pintos Risso, it is a project from 1974, but was completed in 1995. The building has a radio antenna that is used by several stations.
