= Alfredo Vásquez Acevedo =

Uruguayan politician

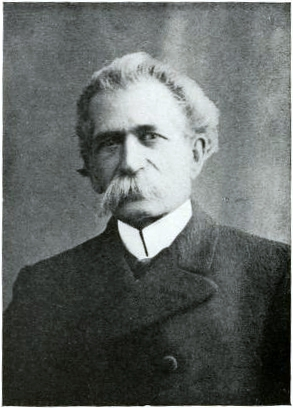
Alfredo Vásquez Acevedo in 1921

Alfredo Vásquez Acevedo was a Uruguayan rector and politician.

He served as member of the National Council of Administration.

He is on the 500 Uruguayan peso, and the Alfredo Vásquez Acevedo Institute in Montevideo is named for him.
