= Luis Pérez Aguirre =

Uruguayan priest

Personal details
- Born: 22 April 1941 Montevideo, Uruguay
- Died: 25 February 2001 (aged 59) Canelones Department, Uruguay
- Education: Pontifical Catholic University of Valparaíso (BA); University of Toronto (MA); Comillas Pontifical University (PhD)
- Profession: Sociologist; Theologist

Luis Pérez Aguirre (22 April 1941−25 January 2001) was an Uruguayan jesuit priest who highlighted for his human rights activism.

== Career ==
He was the second of eight siblings of a family of the Uruguayan economic and social elite. His primary education studies were carried out at the Richard Anderson School from 1946 to 1953. He completed the High School at the Colegio del Sagrado Corazón (former Colegio Seminario), run by the Jesuit Fathers. In 1958, he entered the Ángel Adami Civil Aviation School and made his first flight when he was 17. Two years earlier, in 1956, he had climbed the Andes Mountains to 5,000 meters.

His priestly vocation was born in 1960s and he began his jesuit novitiate: he studied and graduated in Classical Humanities at the Colegio Loyola in Chile. Then, in the same country, he studied Psychology at the Pontifical Catholic University of Valparaíso (PUCV). Upon his return to Uruguay, in 1965, he worked as French teacher as well as Geography professor at the San Javier de los Padres Jesuitas School, a high school in Tacuarembó.

From 1967 to 1970, he studied in Canada at the University of Toronto, obtaining there a master's degree in Religious Sciences. Years later, in 1972, he completed a BA in Theology at the Pontifical University of San Miguel, Argentina. His postgraduate studies in Sociology were carried out in 1978 at the Comillas Pontifical University in Cantabria, Spain.

He had been ordained a deacon in 1969 in Toronto. Similarly, was ordained as a Jesuit priest on July 4, 1970, at Sacred Heart Parish in Montevideo.
