= Colegio Nacional José Pedro Varela =

José Pedro Varela National College
- Colegio Nacional José Pedro Varela
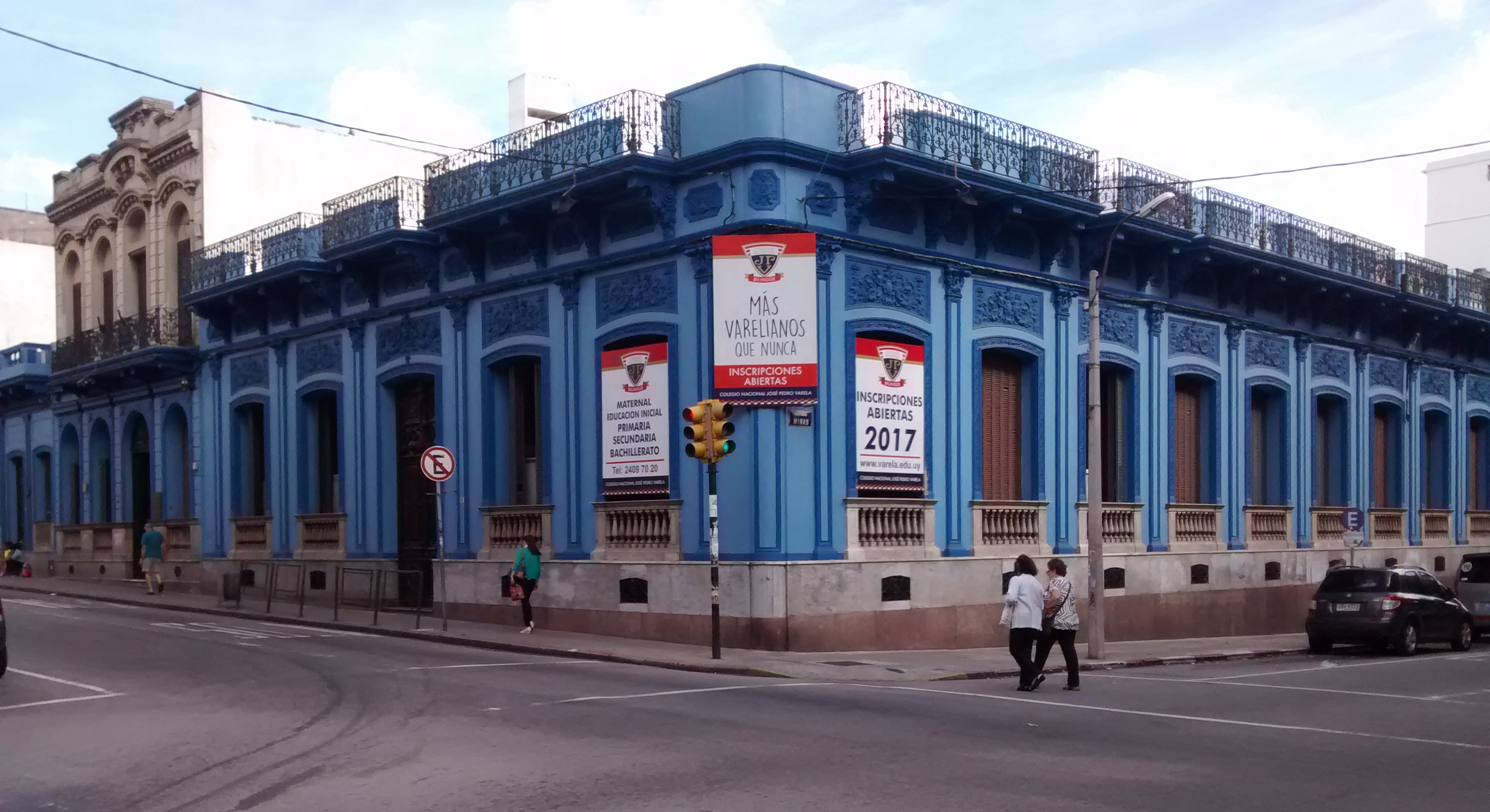
- Montevideo and Ciudad de la Costa; Uruguay

Information
- Type: Private co-educational secular day school
- Established: October 24, 1942; 83 years ago
- Colors: Blue , Red and White
- Website: www.varela.edu.uy

The Colegio Nacional José Pedro Varela (Spanish for 'José Pedro Varela National College') is a private school for boys and girls aged two to eighteen in Montevideo, Uruguay.

It serves secular and bilingual pre-school, primary, secondary and the pre-university education. Named after José Pedro Varela –who in 1876 carried out a reform that established free, compulsory and secular education in Uruguay–, it has two campuses: one in Cordón, Montevideo and another in Ciudad de la Costa, Canelones Department.

== History ==
It was created by the Uruguayan Teaching Society (Spanish: Sociedad Uruguaya de Enseñanza) as an all-girls educational institute for secular training on October 24, 1942. Its first headmistress was Deborah Vitale D'Amico (1888 – 1957). Several days later, the National College established its own headquarters, located in the old premises of the Historical Museum, on Colonia St. in barrio Cordón. It had 308 students and a staff of 47 teachers.

Four years later, boys had already begun to be admitted, the primary education section had kindergarten from the age of four and a pre-lycee seventh grade. In addition, the secondary education section had twelve groups.

In 2015, the college had 400 employees and 1,170 students. In December 2015, it went through a critical financial situation and its employees were sent to unemployment insurance. The then Board of Directors decides to close the School, without having the approval for it from the Assembly of Members of the Uruguayan Teaching Society, the highest body that administers the institution.

In January 2016, the Assembly of Members of the Uruguayan Teaching Society accepted a proposal presented by the parents of the students, alumni and officials, so the school continued with its operation. The Uruguayan Teaching Society decided to reopen the school as of February 1, 2016. At that time it had 850 students and 338 employees, after the expiration of 96 contracts. In February 2017, the authorities of the institution decided to stop serving primary education on the Ciudad de la Costa campus.

== Alumni ==
- Beatriz Argimón, 18th and current Vice President of Uruguay.
- Patricia Kramer, singer-songwriter and politician.
- Mercedes Menafra, First Lady of Uruguay from 2000 to 2005.
