= Colegio Seminario =

Coordinates: 34.9077°S 56.1835°W

Seminario School
- Colegio Seminario

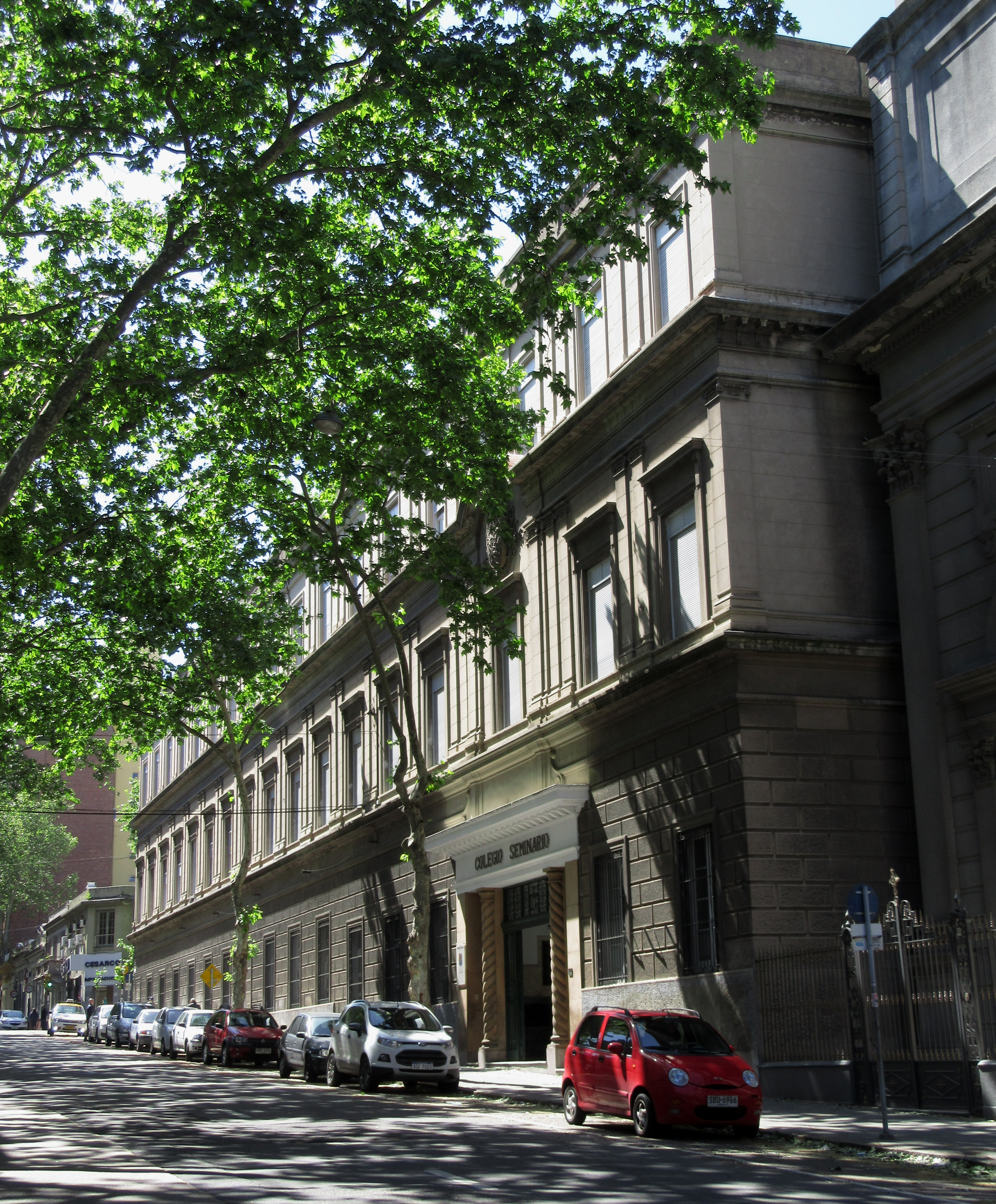
- Montevideo; Uruguay

Information
- Former name: Sacred Heart College
- Type: Private Catholic co-educational day school
- Motto: Ut Serviam
- Religious affiliation: Roman Catholic (Jesuit)
- Patron saint: Sacred Heart
- Established: March 1880, 1; 146 years ago
- Rector: S.J. Alvaro Pacheco
- Enrollment: 1,845 (2005)
- Colors: Blue and white
- Website: www.seminario.edu.uy/index.php/es/

The Colegio Seminario (Spanish for 'Seminary School') is a co-educational private school in Montevideo, Uruguay. It was founded in 1880 as a school of theology for boys who aspired to the priesthood, and served as such until 1922, when it became a conventional all-boys school.

Of Jesuit Catholic religious affiliation, it currently serves preschool, primary school, and secondary school. The Sacred Heart Church is in the same complex and is used for various school functions. Colegio Seminario has educated a wide range of notable alumni, including high-ranking politicians.

== History ==
Conciliar Seminary of Montevideo, 1907

The Conciliar Seminary of Montevideo was inaugurated on March 1, 1880, by the Society of Jesus, which had returned to operate in Uruguay in 1872 after being previously expelled. It was housed in a building that had begun construction in 1878 with financing from the wealthy Jackson-Errazquín family. The first students were children who aspired to be seminarians, but the following year lay students were admitted, and each year a new school year began to be served.

In 1899 the name of the school was changed to Colegio del Sagrado Corazón (Spanish for 'Sacred Heart College'), but colloquially it continued to be known as Colegio Seminario (Spanish for 'Seminary College'). In 1922, it stopped being a theology school to train priests, remaining only a school for boys, which caused the number of students to increase.

In 1952 the first female teachers were hired, and in 1966 the first female students were admitted to high school, becoming a co-educational school. In 2010 the school was renamed again to Colegio Seminario (Spanish for 'Seminary College').

Since July 2021, the school's rector is S.J. Alvaro Pacheco.

== Campus ==
The Colegio Seminario is housed in a building built in the 1870s and located in the Cordón neighborhood of Montevideo. The school's complex also includes the Sacred Heart Church, which is used for various school functions.

== Activities ==
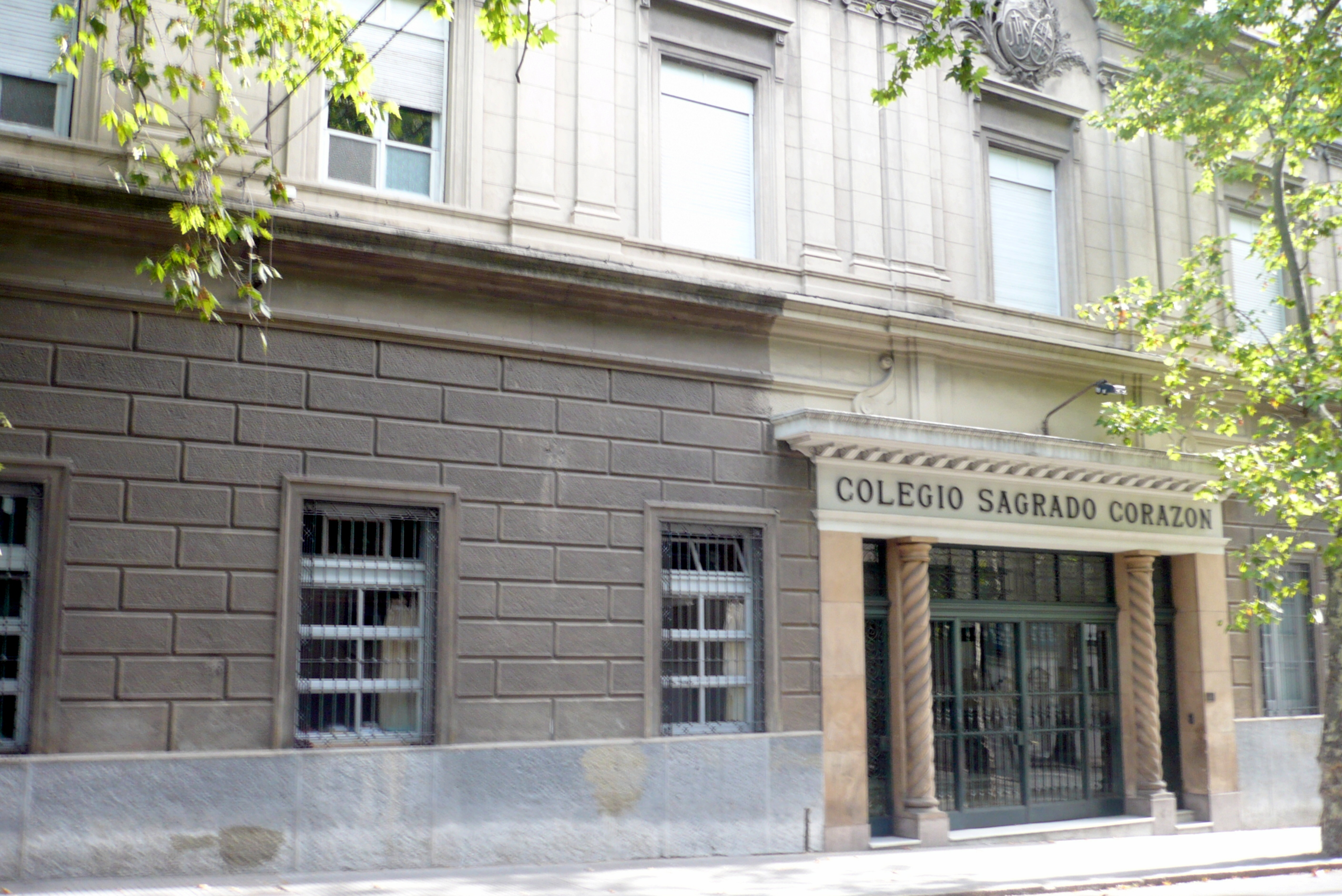
School's main entrance

The Seminario Club is a social and sports club that brings together the school's educational community. It competes in rugby, hockey, soccer, handball, basketball and volleyball, and is part of several sports federations.

== Notable alumni ==
- Luis Alberto Lacalle – politician and 36th president of Uruguay
- Daniel Martínez Villamil – politician and 34th intendant of Montevideo
- Rodolfo Nin Novoa – politician and 14th vice president of Uruguay
- Luis Pérez Aguirre – Jesuit priest
- Numa Turcatti – law student; died in the crash of Uruguayan Air Force Flight 571
