= Nuestra Señora del Rosario y Santo Domingo, Montevideo =

Roman Catholic parish church in Cordón, Montevideo, Uruguay

Nuestra Señora del Rosario y Santo Domingo (Dominicos)
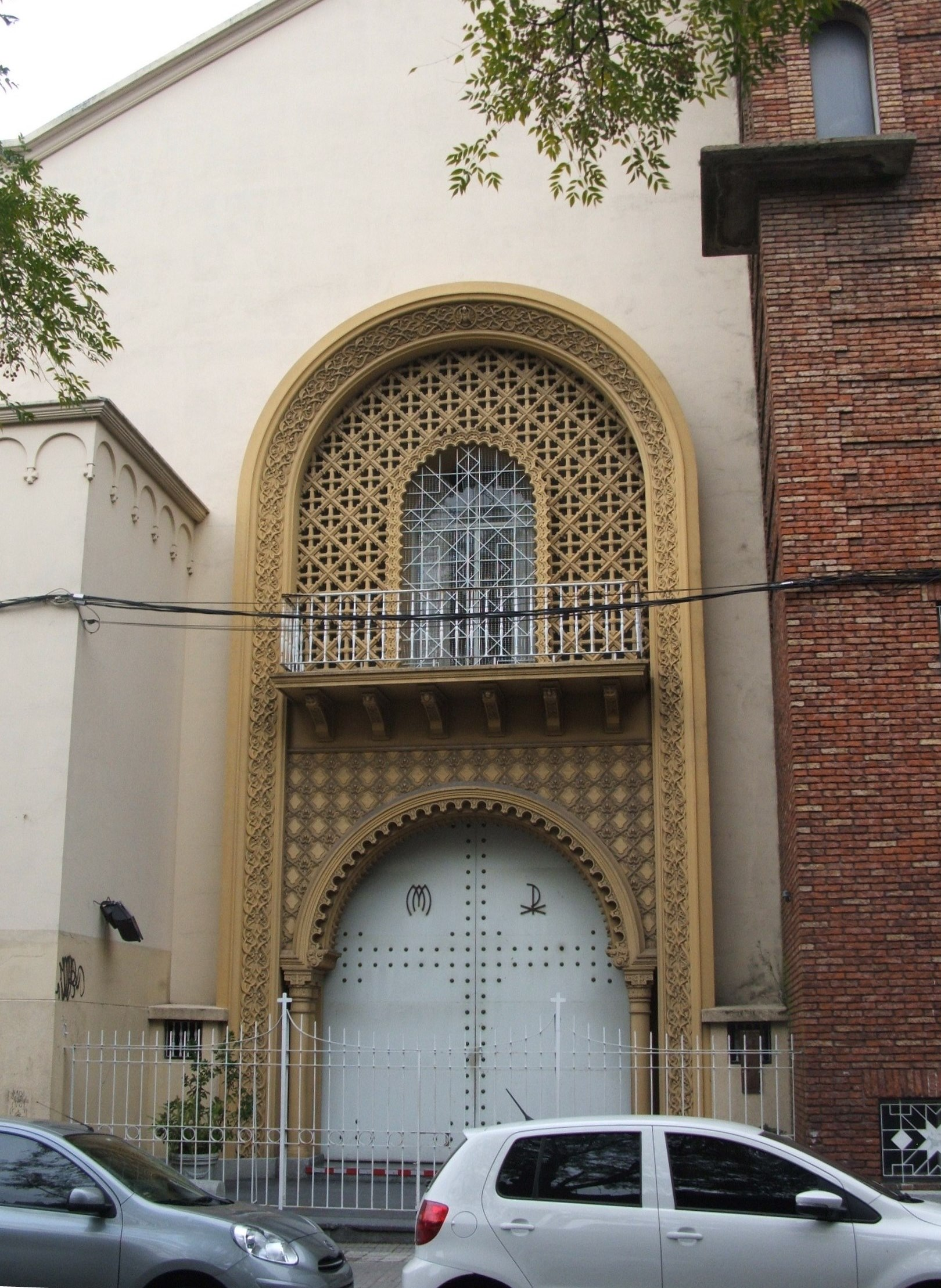

Religion
- Affiliation: Roman Catholic
- Ecclesiastical or organizational status: Parish church

Location
- Location: Mario Cassinoni 1337; Montevideo, Uruguay
- Interactive map of Nuestra Señora del Rosario y Santo Domingo (Dominicos)

Architecture
- Type: Church
- Style: Neo-Mudéjar

The Church of Our Lady of the Rosary and Saint Dominic (Spanish: Iglesia de Nuestra Señora del Rosario y Santo Domingo), popularly known as Iglesia de los Domínicos, is a Roman Catholic parish church in the neighbourhood of Cordón, Montevideo, Uruguay.

This church is unique in Uruguay as it is perhaps the only temple built in Neo-Mudéjar style in all the country; it also has a brick tower. Held by the Dominicans, it is dedicated to their patron saint Dominic and also to Our Lady of the Rosary. It was consecrated on 6 January 1947.

The parish was established on 18 May 1958.
