= Ruben Melogno =

Uruguayan singer (1945–2020)

Ruben Melogno (Montevideo, 2 December 1945 – Madrid, 27 March 2020) was an Uruguayan singer.

== Biography ==
Melogno was a member of the Opus Alpha and Ovni 87 bands. He became famous as a singer for the rock band Psiglo. In 1973 they recorded their first album, Ideación. The cover illustration was created by Melogno.

In 1975 he settled in Spain along with Psiglo members Jorge García Banegas (keyboard player), César Rechac, Hermes Calabria (drummer) and Charlie Oviedo (bassist).

In 2018 he participated in the celebrations for the twenty years of La Triple Nelson at the Solís Theatre.

After living in Spain for forty years, Melogno died of COVID-19 during the pandemic in the country, in March 2020, aged 74.
