= José Pedro Varela =

Uruguayan sociologist, journalist and politician (1845–1879)

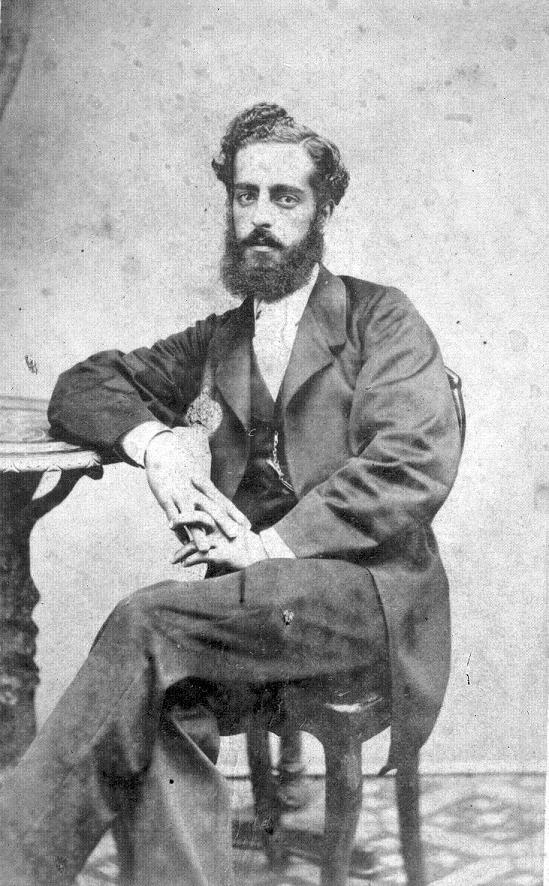
- Born: José Pedro Varela Berro; 19 March 1845; Montevideo, Uruguay
- Died: 24 October 1879 (aged 34); Montevideo, Uruguay
- Occupations: journalist, politician, educator
- Political party: Colorado Party
- Spouse: Adela Acevedo Vásquez
- Parent(s): Benita Gumersinda Berro; Jacobo Dionisio Varela

José Pedro Varela Berro (19 March 1845 - 24 October 1879) was an Uruguayan sociologist, journalist, politician, and educator. He was born in Montevideo. Uruguay adopted free, compulsory, and secular education in 1876, thanks to his efforts. It was because of Varela that Uruguay established the 1877 Law of Common Education, which continues to influence Uruguay. The José Pedro Varela National School is named after him.

== Early life ==
José Pedro Varela was born on 19 March 1845 in Montevideo. He was the son of Benita Gumersinda Berro Larrañaga and Jacobo Dionisio Varela Sanxines.

== See also ==
- Lorenzo Latorre
