= Sagrado Corazón, Montevideo =

Church in Montevideo, Uruguay

Coordinates: 34°54′28″S 56°11′3″W

Iglesia del Sagrado Corazón (Seminario)
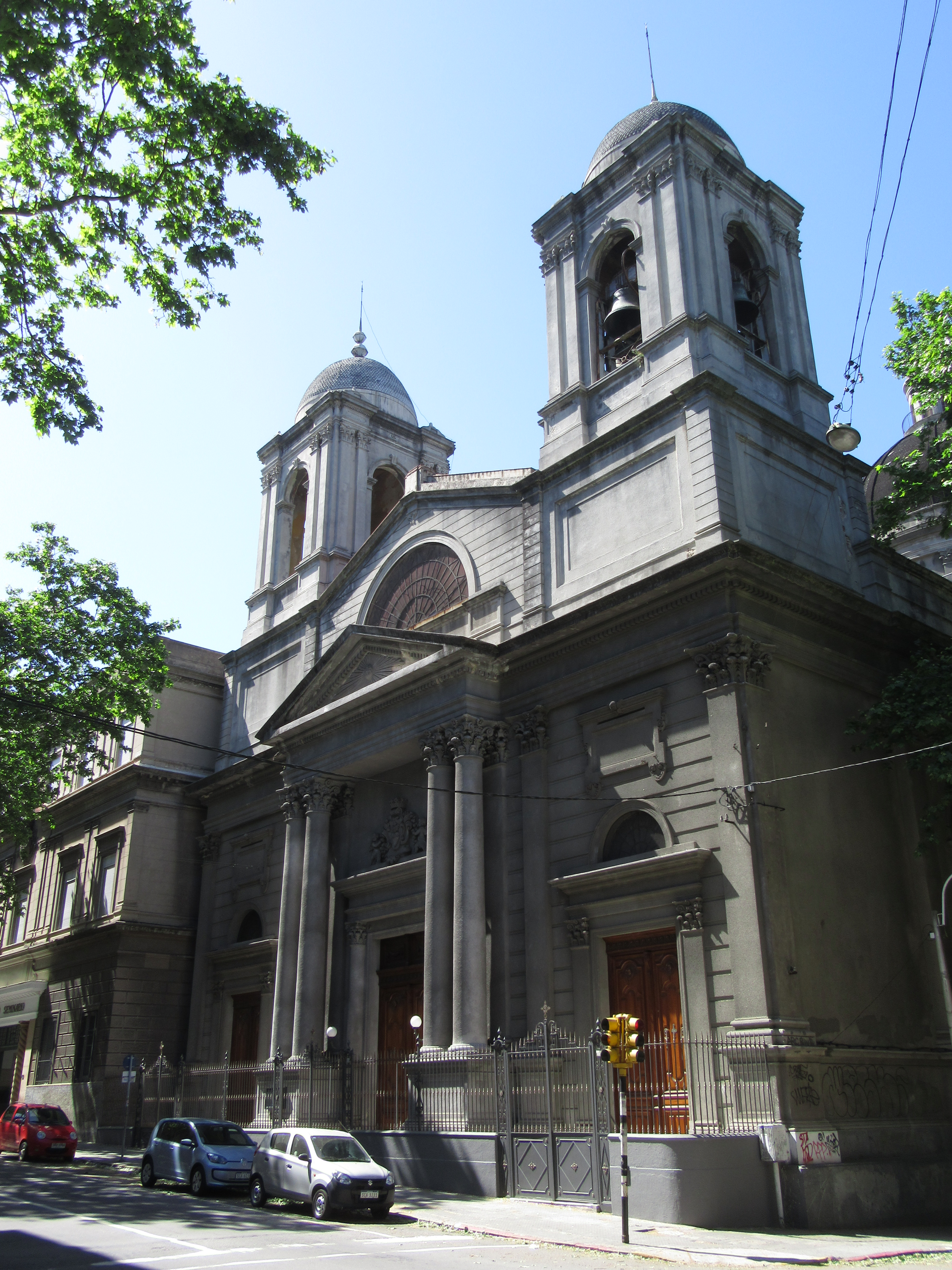

Religion
- Affiliation: Roman Catholic
- Ecclesiastical or organisational status: Parish church
- Year consecrated: 1891

Location
- Location: Soriano 1458; Montevideo, Uruguay
- Interactive map of Iglesia del Sagrado Corazón (Seminario)

Architecture
- Type: Church
- Direction of façade: North

Sacred Heart Church (Spanish: Iglesia del Sagrado Corazón), popularly known as Iglesia del Seminario, is a Roman Catholic parish church in Montevideo, Uruguay. It was established on 9 April 1891.

Held by the Society of Jesus, it is dedicated to the Sacred Heart. As the building was originally part of a seminary (nowadays a school, Colegio Seminario).

== See also ==
- List of Jesuit sites
