= Natalia Mardero =

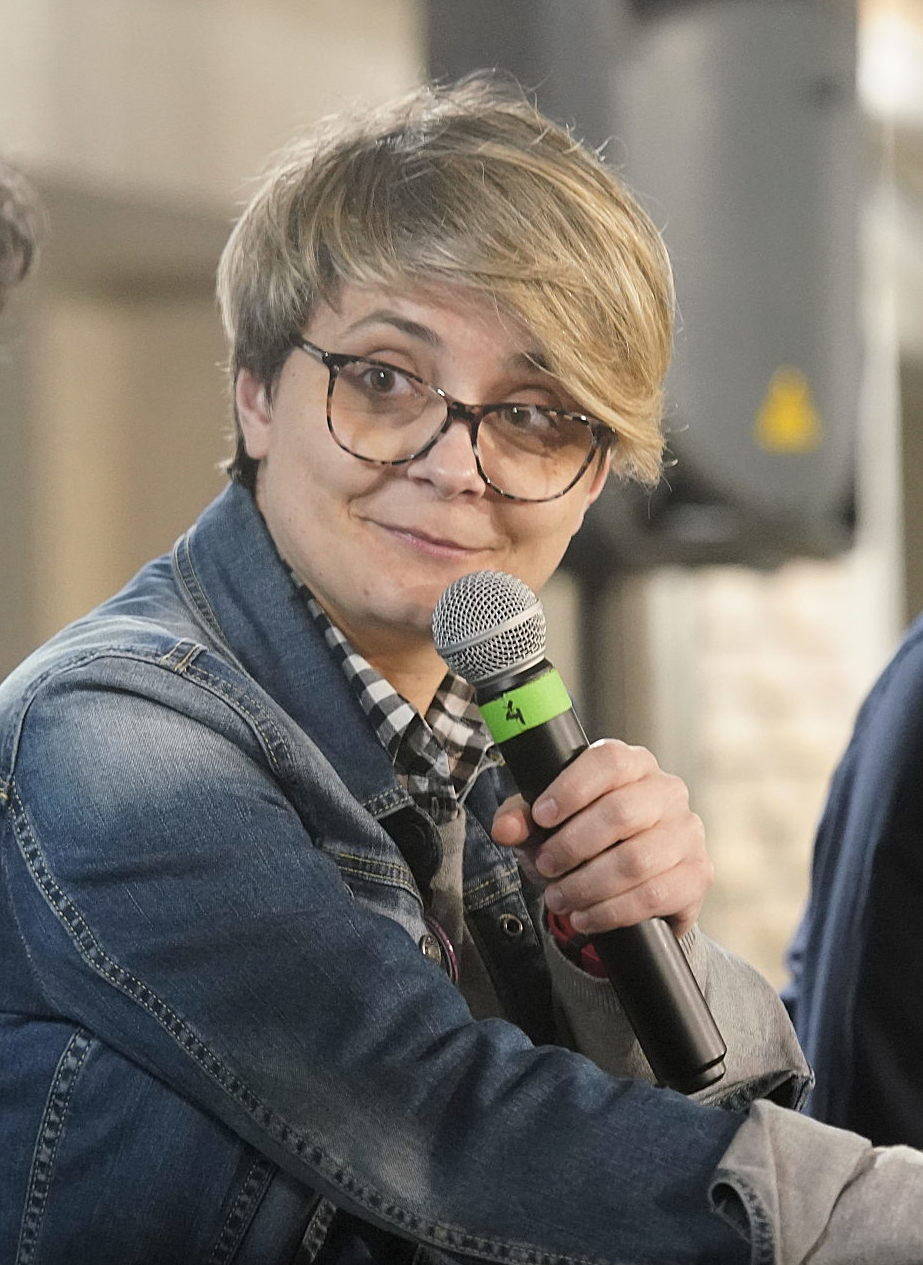
- Natalia Mardero in 2019
- Born: September 22, 1975 (age 50); Montevideo
- Education: Universidad Católica del Uruguay
- Occupations: writer, journalist
- Writing career
- Language: Spanish

Natalia Mardero (Montevideo, 22 September 1975) is a Uruguayan writer and journalist.

== Works ==
- 2001, Posmonauta (ed. Latina; Irrupciones 2010)
- 2004, Guía para un universo
- 2012, Gato en el ropero y otros haikus
- 2014, Cordón Soho
- 2019, Escrito en Super 8
