= Alfredo Jones Brown =

Alfredo Jones Brown (Montevideo, 1876 - 1950) was a Uruguayan architect.

His father, Enrique Agustín Jones de Elía, was of British descent; and his mother, Natividad Brown Blanco, was a granddaughter of admiral William Brown.

He graduated as an architect at the University of the Republic.

== Notable works ==
- Edificio Rex
- Instituto Alfredo Vásquez Acevedo
- Escuela Alemania

== Literature ==
- Lucchini, Aurelio (1969). Ideas y formas en la arquitectura nacional. Colección Nuestra Tierra (in Spanish). Vol. 6. Montevideo.
- Lucchini, Aurelio (1986). El Concepto de Arquitectura y su traducción a formas en el territorio que hoy pertenece a Uruguay (in Spanish). Montevideo: Universidad de la República.
