= 18 de Julio Avenue =

Street in Montevideo, Uruguay

Coordinates: 34°54′21.5″S 56°11′33.4″W

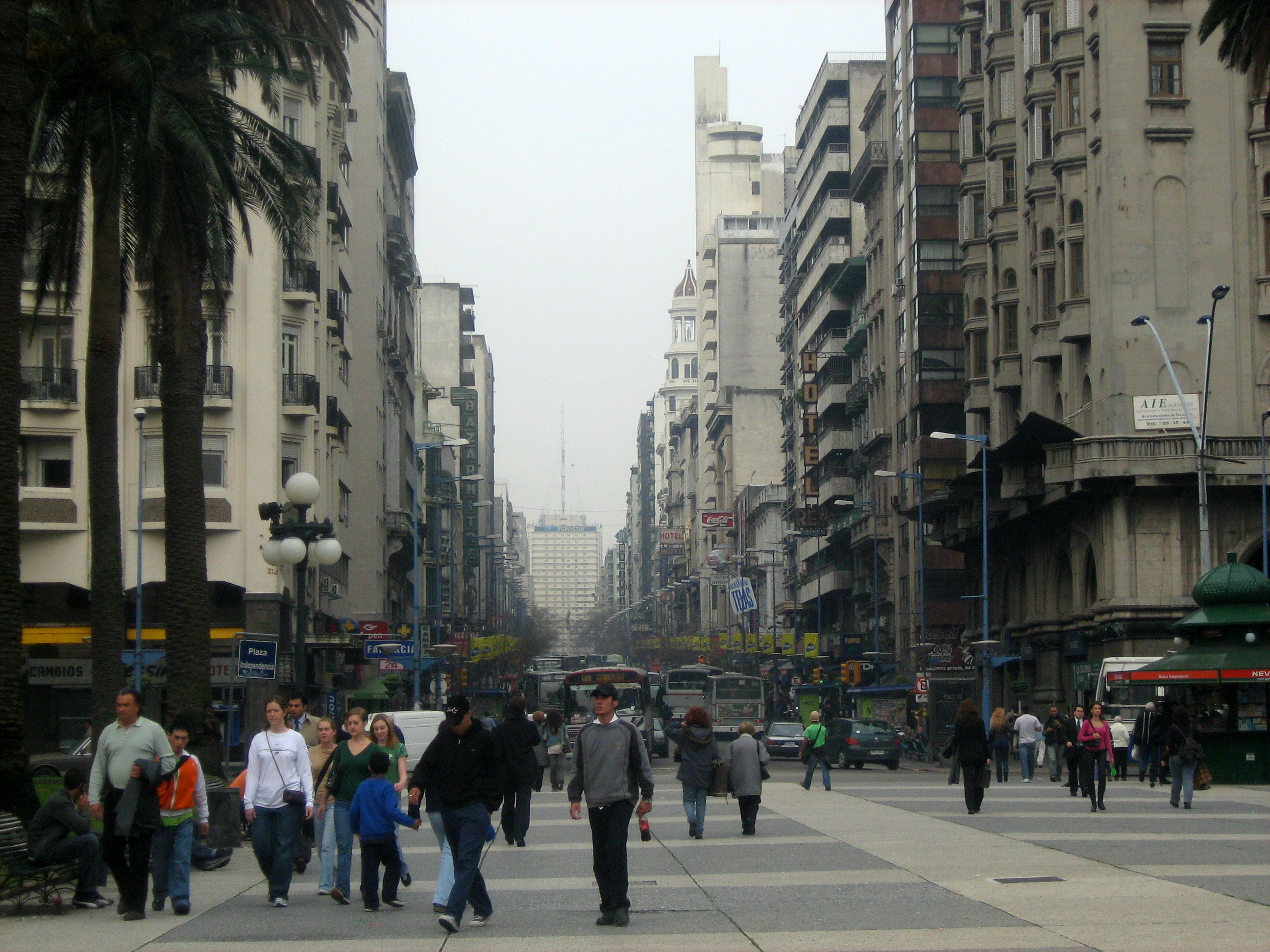
- 18 de Julio Avenue and Gaucho Tower seen from Plaza Independencia.
- Interactive map of 18 de Julio Avenue
- Native name: Avenida 18 de Julio (Spanish)
- Location: Montevideo, Uruguay
- From: Plaza Independencia
- To: Obelisk of Montevideo

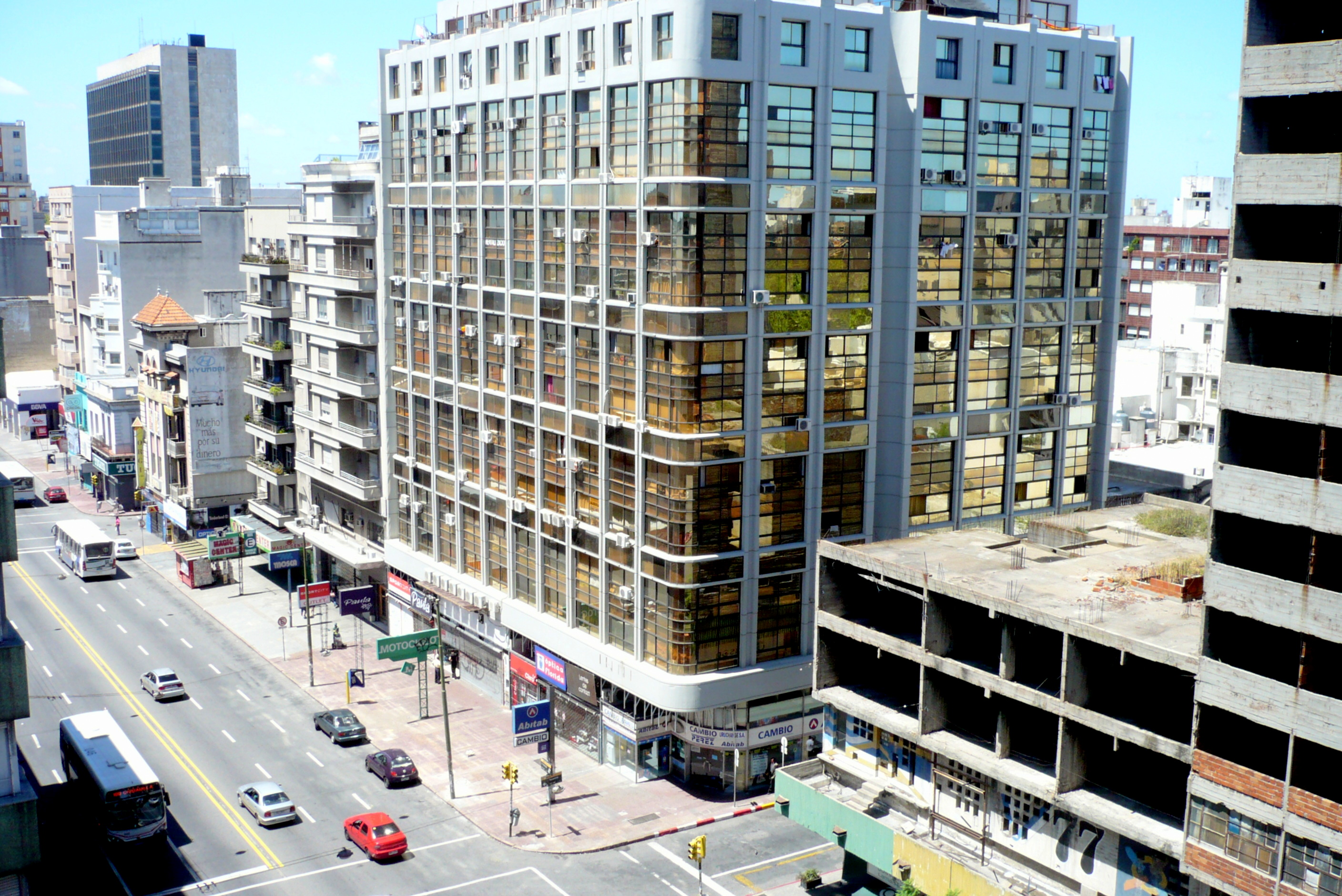
18 de Julio Avenue & Tacuarembó St.

Avenida 18 de Julio, or 18 de Julio Avenue, is the most important avenue in Montevideo, Uruguay. It is named after the date when the country's first Constitution was sworn in, on July 18, 1830.

It starts from Plaza Independencia at the limits of the Ciudad Vieja (the Old City), crosses the barrios Centro and Cordón and ends at the Obelisk of Montevideo in Tres Cruces, where it meets Artigas Boulevard. Although not the widest or longest avenue of the city, it is considered as the most important of Montevideo, both as a commercial center and because of the many tourist attractions along its length. It is also the district of Montevideo, as well as Ciudad Vieja, where art deco architecture is best preserved, an example of which is the Rinaldi, Díaz and Salvo palaces.

== History ==
Avenida 18 de Julio was conceived as the axis of the "New City", after the 1829 Constituent Assembly decreed the demolition of the city's walls and fortifications. The avenue was designed in a straight line, up to Médanos Street (current Javier Various Amorín St.) where it forked between Camino Maldonado (east extension of current 18 de Julio Avenue) and Estanzuela (current Constituent Avenue).

With the expansion of the city, the Plaza de Cagancha was chosen as the nerve center, which is why the "zero kilometer" of Uruguay was established there, where the country's road system begins. In the center of the square stands the Statue of Peace with a total height of 17 meters and inaugurated in 1867 in tribute to the peace that ended the civil war between the "traditional parties" —the National and the Colorado— two years earlier.

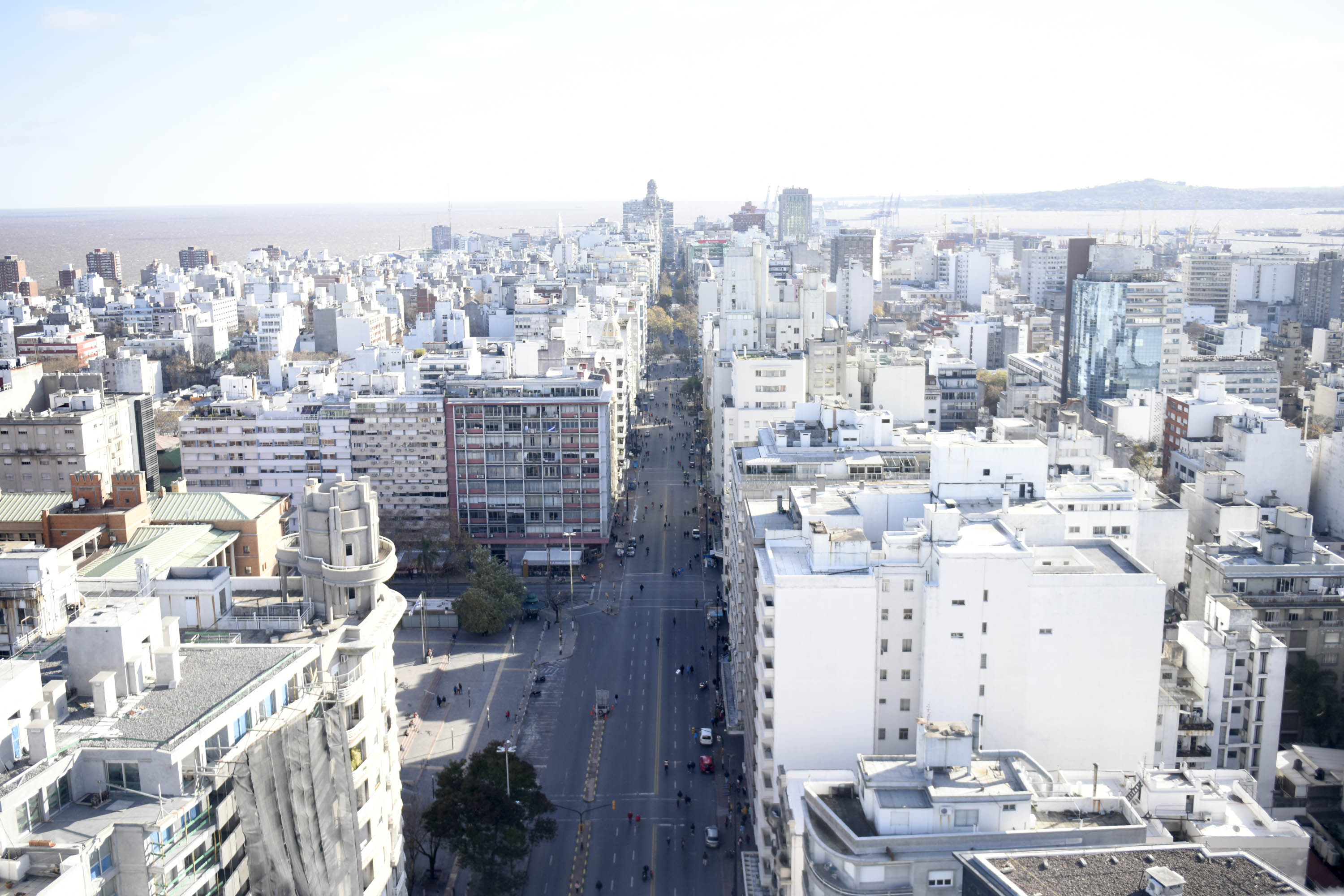
Aerial space

== Landmarks ==
The main landmarks across this avenue are:

- Artigas Mausoleum, located at the beginning of the avenue in Plaza Independencia
- Palacio Salvo
- Edificio Lapido
- Plaza Fabini
- City Hall of Montevideo
- Iglesia del Cordón
- Universidad de la República
- Obelisk of Montevideo, located at the end of the avenue when it meets Artigas Boulevard.
- Edificio London París

== Images ==
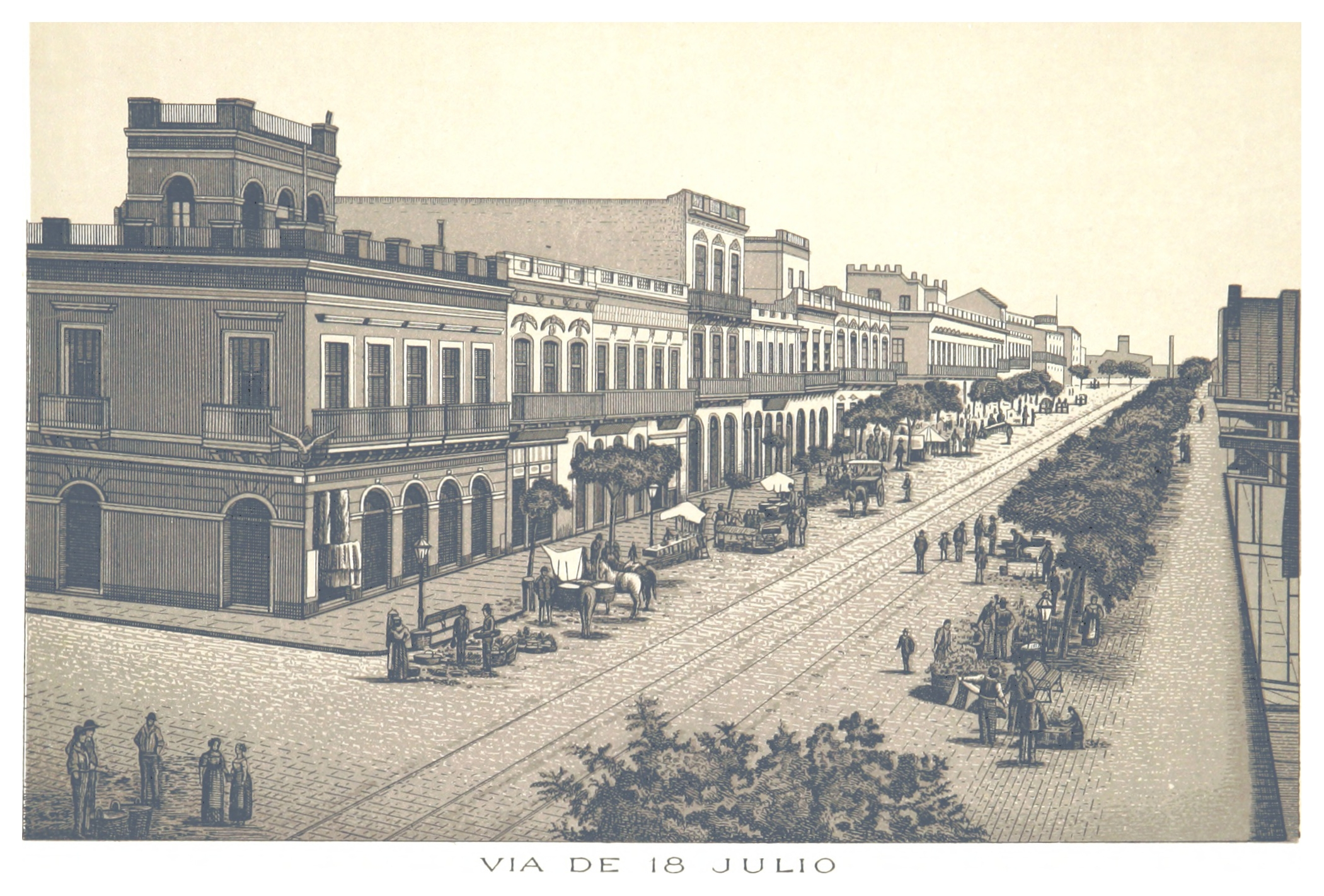
Drawing of the Avenue in 1885

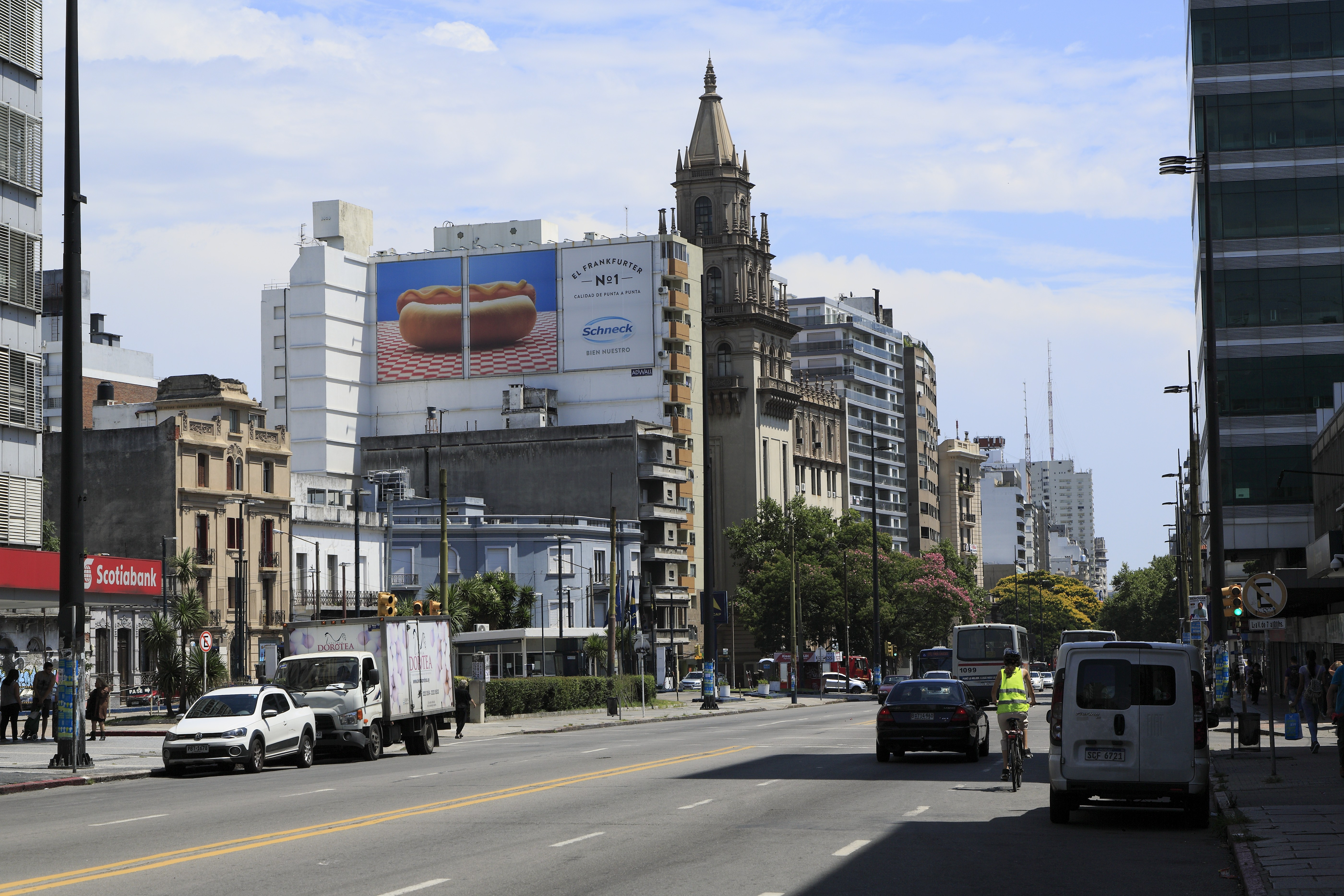
View of the Avenue

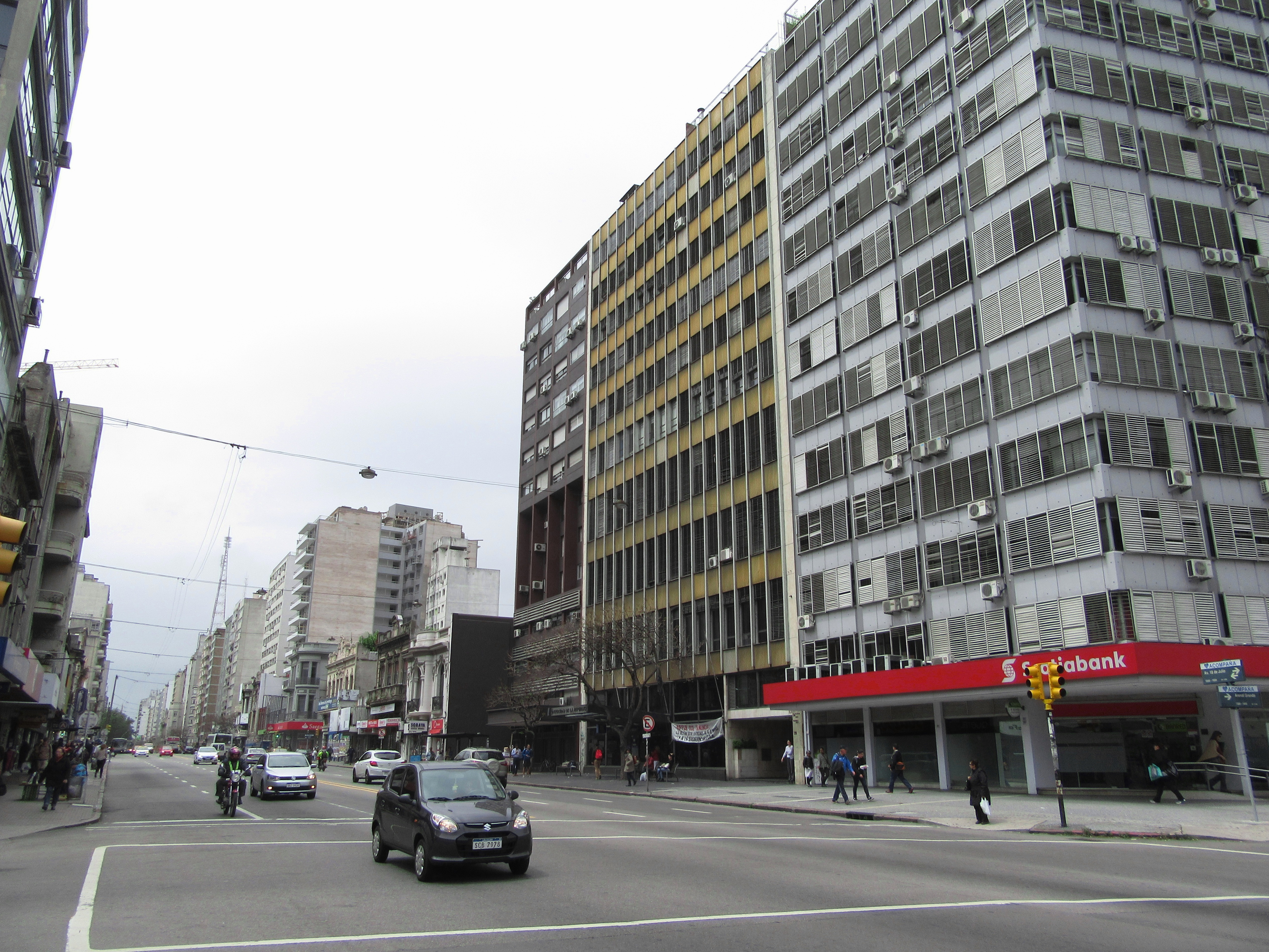
18 de Julio Ave. & Arenal Grande St.

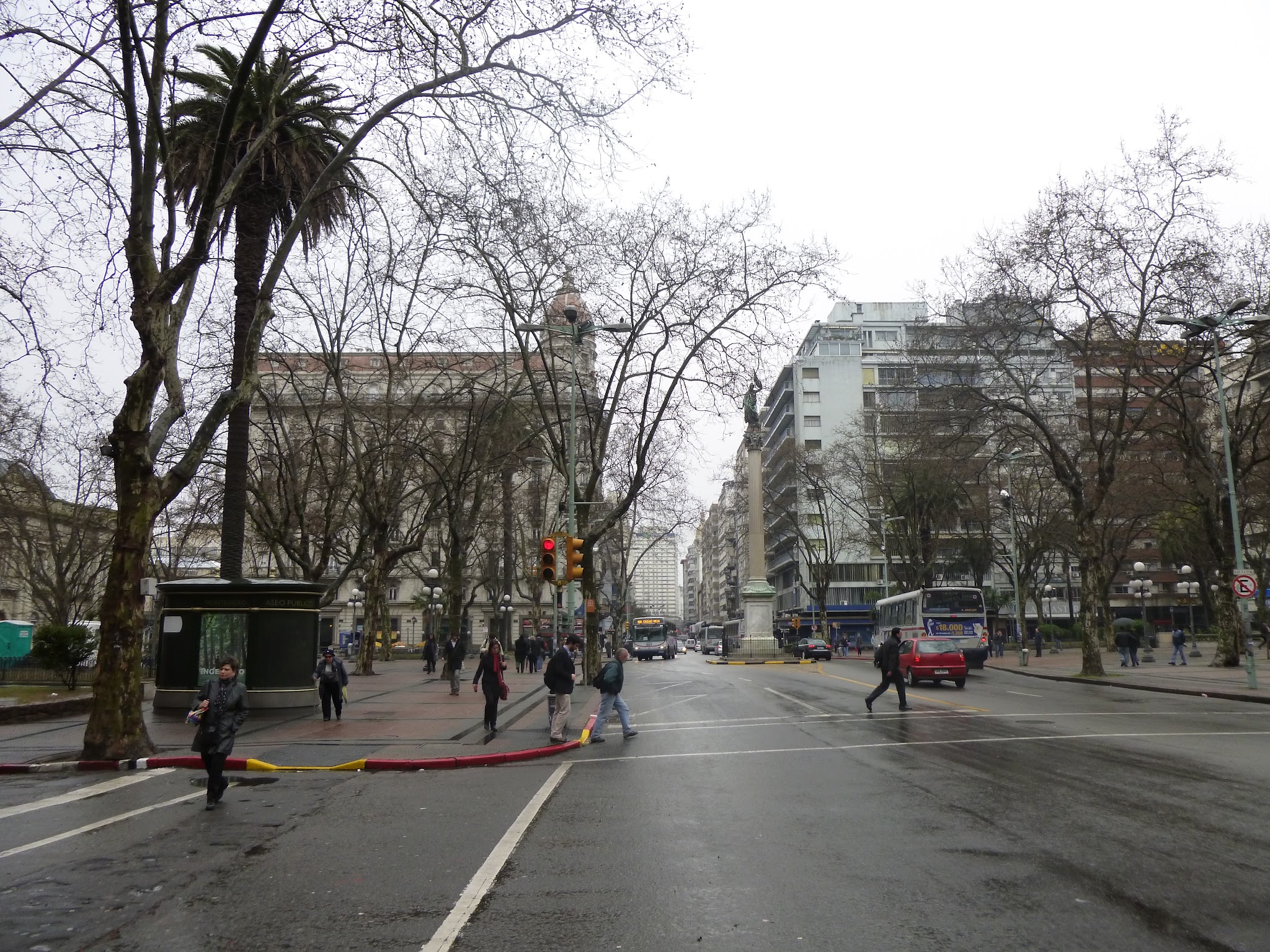
Plaza Cagancha, which is crossed by 18 de Julio Ave.
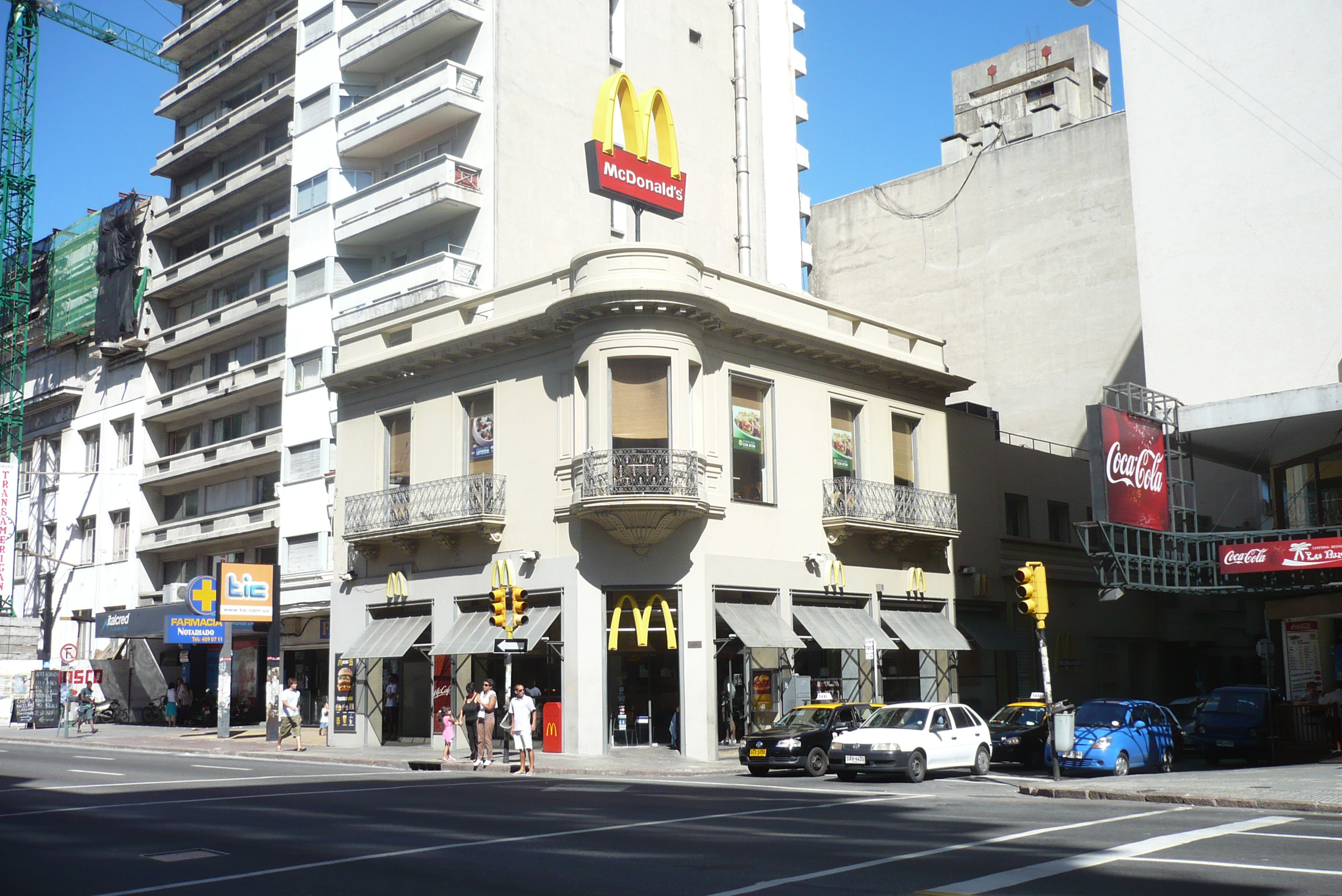
McDonald's Restaurant in 18 de Julio Ave. & Gaboto St.

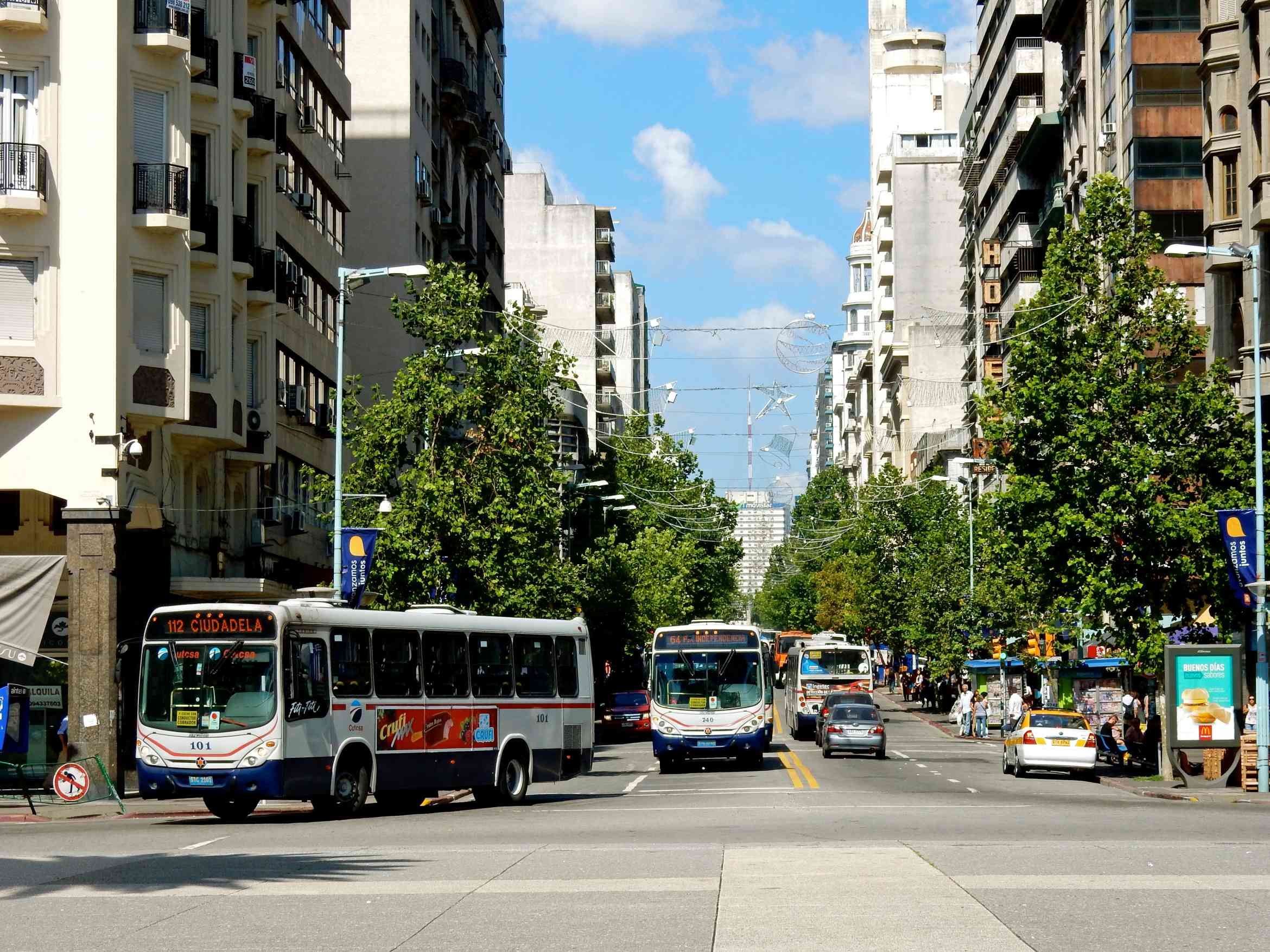
View of the Avenue from Plaza Independencia

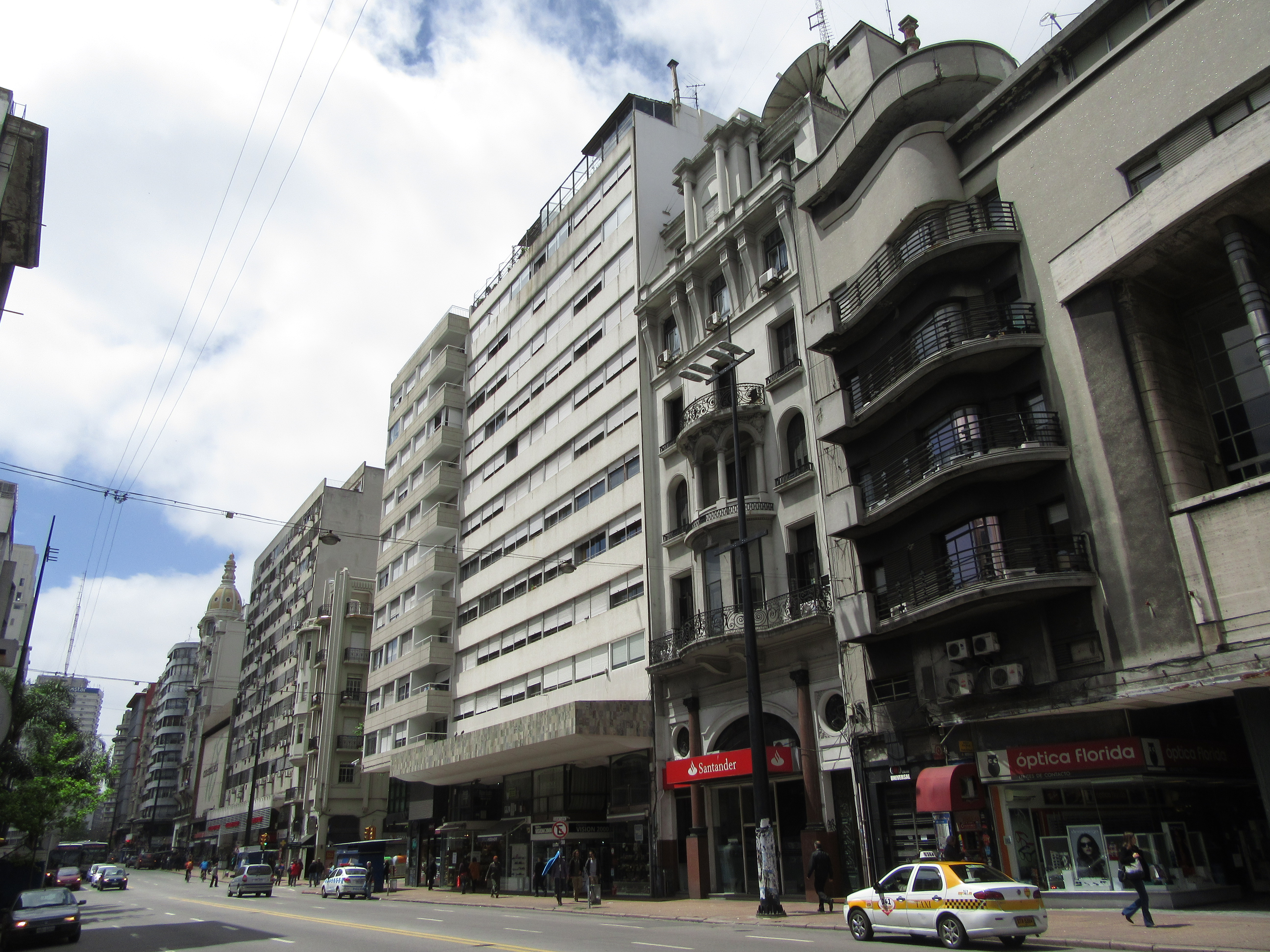
18 de Julio Ave. between Cuareim St. & Yí St.

== See also ==
- Website of the Municipality of Montevideo
