= Edificio London París =

Building in Montevideo, Uruguay

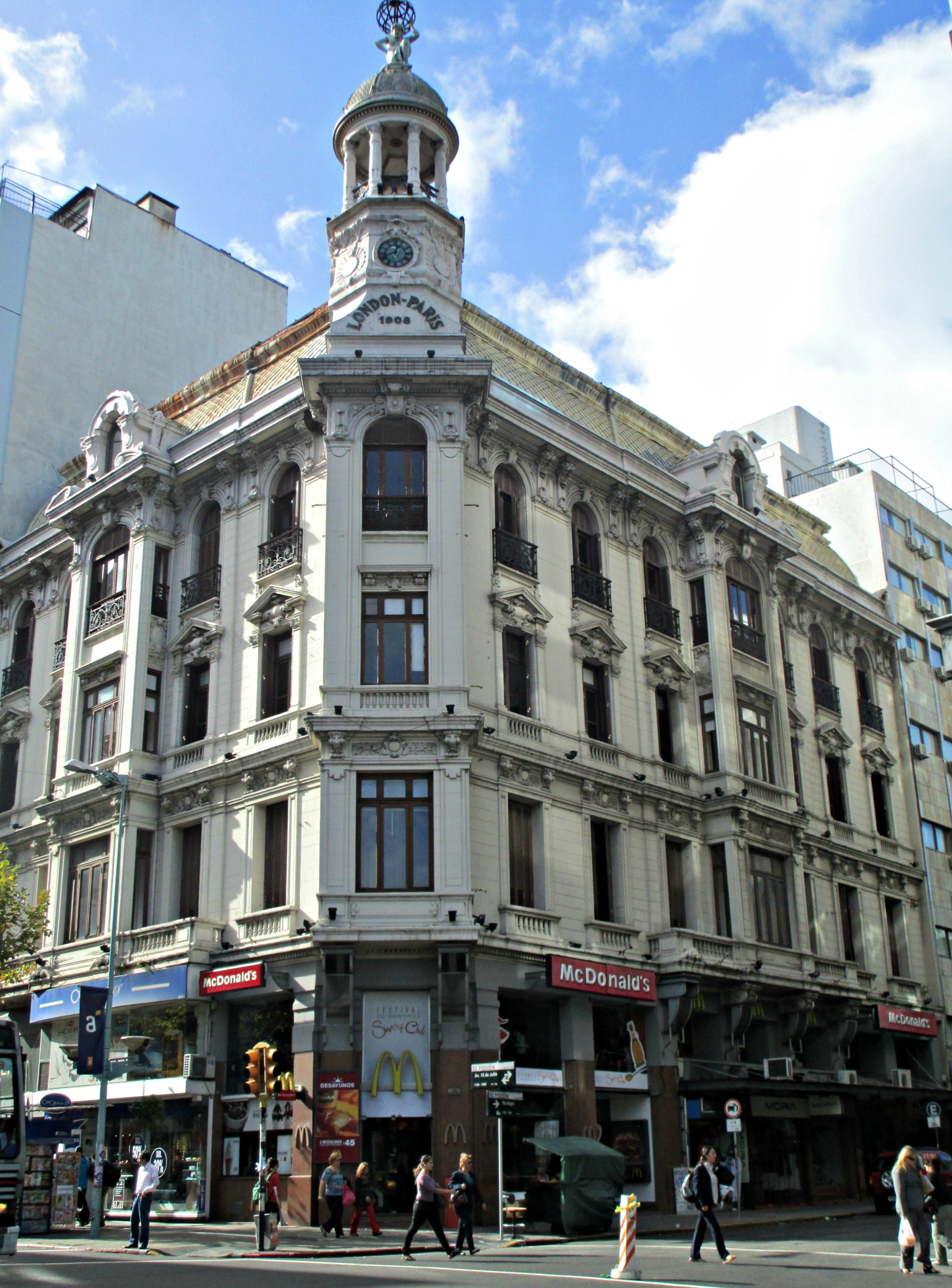
- Edificio London París in 2013.
- Interactive map of the Edificio London París area

General information
- Type: Offices and apartments
- Architectural style: Eclectic
- Location: 18 de Julio Avenue and Río Negro in Centro, Montevideo, Uruguay
- Coordinates: 34.90623°S 56.19343°W
- Construction started: 1905
- Completed: 1908

Design and construction
- Architect: John Adams or Julián Masquelez

Edificio London París (English: London Paris Building), also known as The Standard Life, is a building located at the intersection of 18 de Julio Avenue and Río Negro in Central Montevideo, Uruguay. Built between 1905 and 1908 in an eclectic style, it has variously been ascribed to the design of British architect John Adams and Uruguayan Julián Masquelez. Between 1908 and 1966 it housed the department store London París.

== History ==
=== Construction and design ===
Standard Life commissioned the construction of a building on the corner of 18 de Julio Avenue and Río Negro in 1890. Construction began in 1905. The building was designed in an eclectic style, and was one of the first tall buildings in Montevideo when opened in 1908. It is topped by a narrow zinc, columned cupula supporting an Atlas figure, symbol of The Standard Life insurance company, which was at that time the largest in South America. The cupula is not accessible, lacking any stairs to this level. The three clocks that adorn the base of the dome are actually independent dials with a single central machine.

=== London Paris Department Store ===
The building is known for having been the headquarters of the eponymous department store, the first of its kind in Uruguay. It was founded in 1908 by Pedro Casterés and Juan Pedro Tapié initially on the ground floor and basement of the former British insurance company The Standard Life building, located at 18 de Julio Avenue y Río Negro. Known colloquially as El London, it was well known for its catalogue of products. Casterés later agreed with the Standard to expand into the upper floors of the building, and by 1915, the first annexes on Río Negro were built, which brought the square footage to more than five thousand square meters. By the 1950s, London Paris had seven floors of retail space, two basements, 1,100 employees, a fleet of delivery vans, a doctor's office, nurses and translators. It initially catered to the high end market, marketing a no questions refund policy, importing European fine product and avoiding sales or discounts, agencies or smaller branches. Towards the 1960s it was faced with excess stock of $33 million pesos and began to offer discounted events known as Multis. Social unrest, inflation and government intervention contributed to worsening profits, which ultimately led to the store closing in 1966.

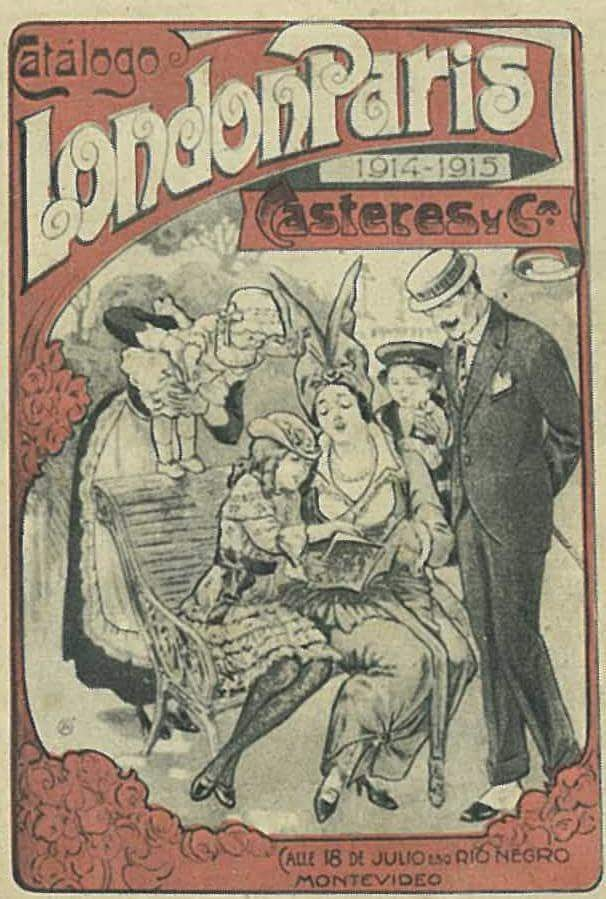
London París Department Store, Catalogue 1914-1915

=== Remodeling and current use ===
Following the closure of the London París store, in the 1970s and 1980s ice cream parlour Papitos occupied the ground floor. In 1995, the ground floor was remodelled by architects Conrado Pinto, Alberto Valenti and Arturo Silva Montero. Five years later, Isaac Benito managed the restoration of the upper floors. In 2008 it was sold for a value of $700,000. The building, originally designed as a residential property, now contains office space and retail outlets. A McDonald's restaurant operates from the ground floor.

=== Design controversy ===
Traditionally, design of the building was ascribed to the English architect and engineer John Adams, who also created the Verdi Room, the British Hospital and the Teatro Victoria. In 2002, César Loustau raised the possibility that construction could have been carried out by Julián Masquelez, a Uruguayan architect trained in Europe, and designer of the Quinta Mendilaharsu on Avenida de las Instrucciones, current home of the Museo Nacional de Antropología (National Museum of Anthropology).
