= Bar Facal =

Coffeehouse in Uruguay

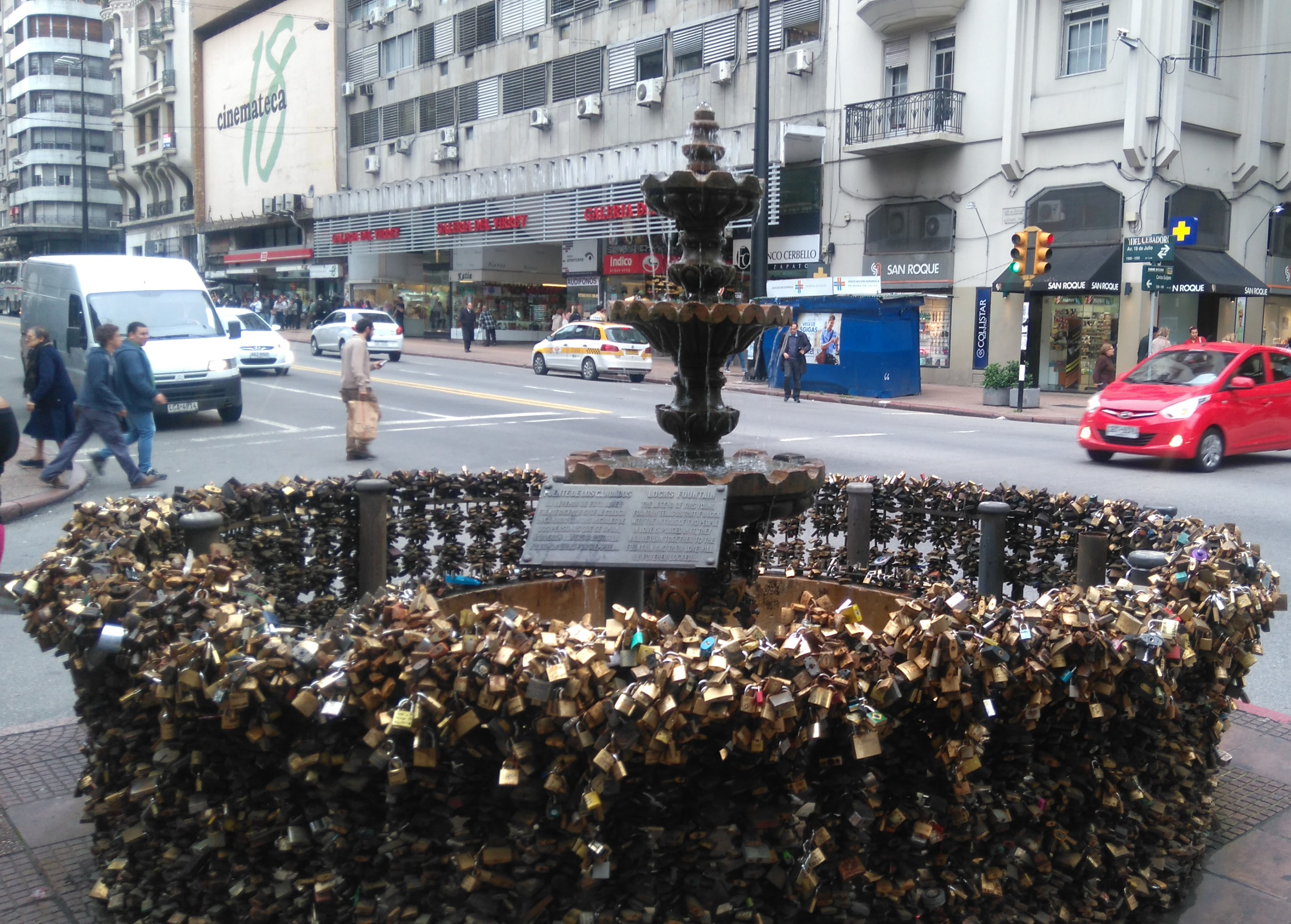
- Interactive map of Bar Facal

Restaurant information
- Established: 1882
- Owners: Manuel Facal and brothers
- Food type: coffee, sandwiches, pizza, ice cream, desserts
- Dress code: informal
- Location: Uruguay; 18 de Julio, Centro, Montevideo, Uruguay
- Reservations: no need
- Website: Bar Facal

Bar Facal is a traditional Uruguayan coffeehouse, located at the corner of 18 de Julio avenue and Yí street, in the Centro neighbourhood of Montevideo, Uruguay. It was founded in 1882 by Galician Manuel Facal and his brothers. It is the oldest Uruguayan downtown bar.

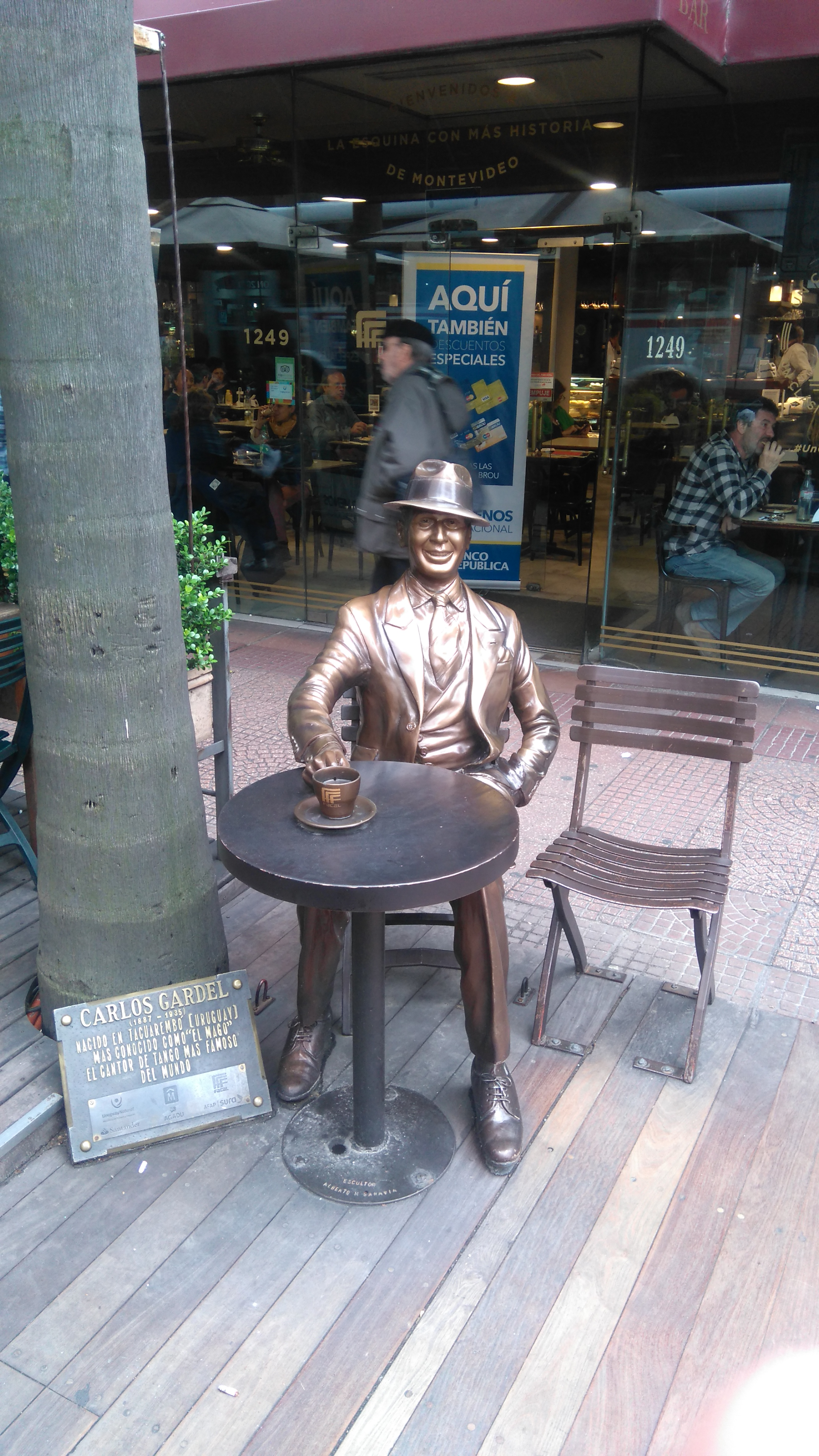
Statue of Carlos Gardel in Bar Facal.

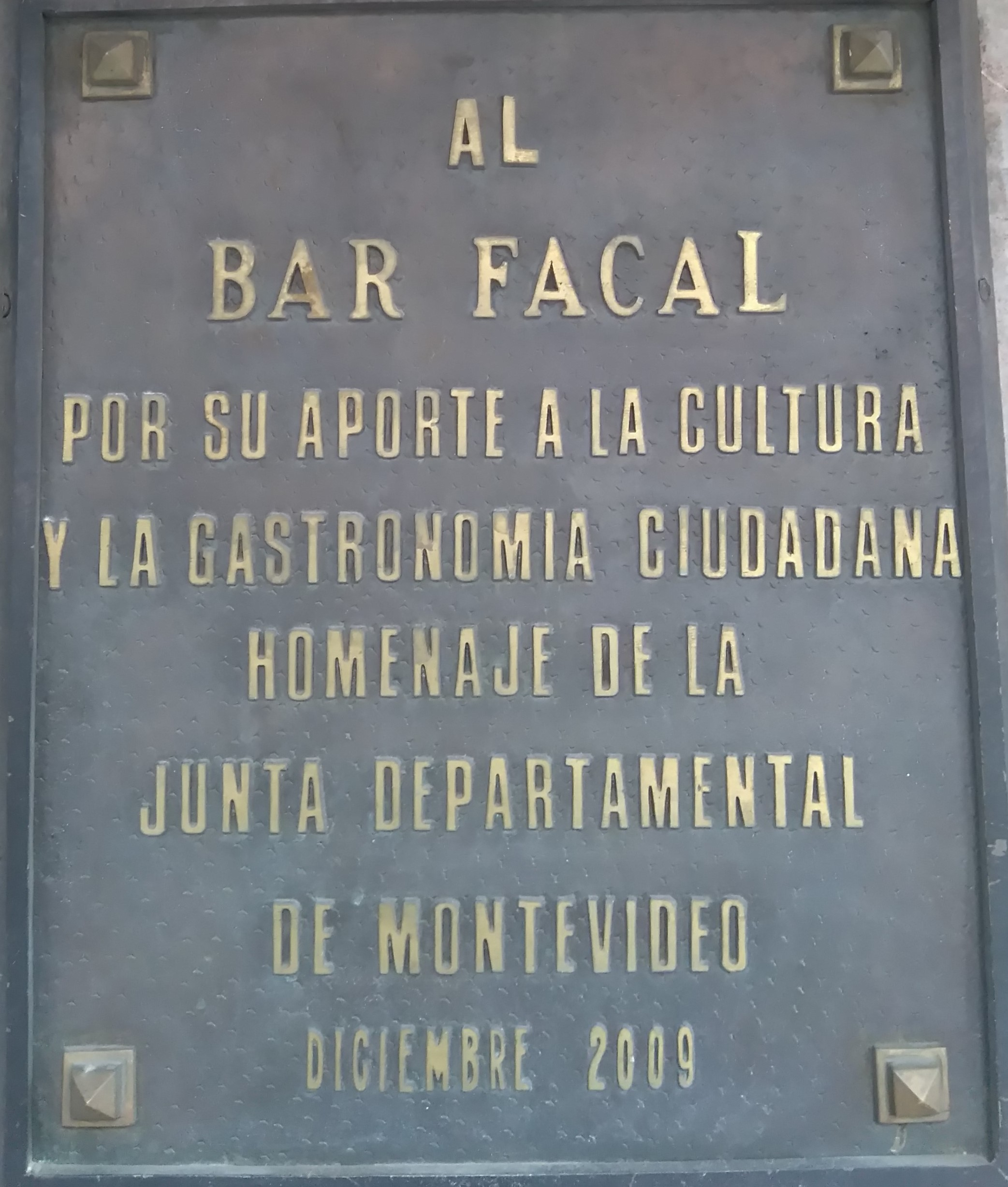
Bar Facal.

== Features ==
The coffeehouse was originally a factory for chocolates and quince candy. Outside the bar is a sculpture of Carlos Gardel, and a fountain where tourists leave love locks. An open tango show is performed from Monday to Saturday at 1 pm.

In 2009, the Departmental Board of Montevideo recognized the contribution of the Bar Facal to the national culture and the national gastronomy with a plaque that is in the wall. There is also a plaque of the Mayor's office in Medellín.

In 2010 a light-emitting diode screen was installed, the first curved screen in the country.
