= UTE Museum =

Coordinates: 34.9067°S 56.1946°W

Museo de UTE
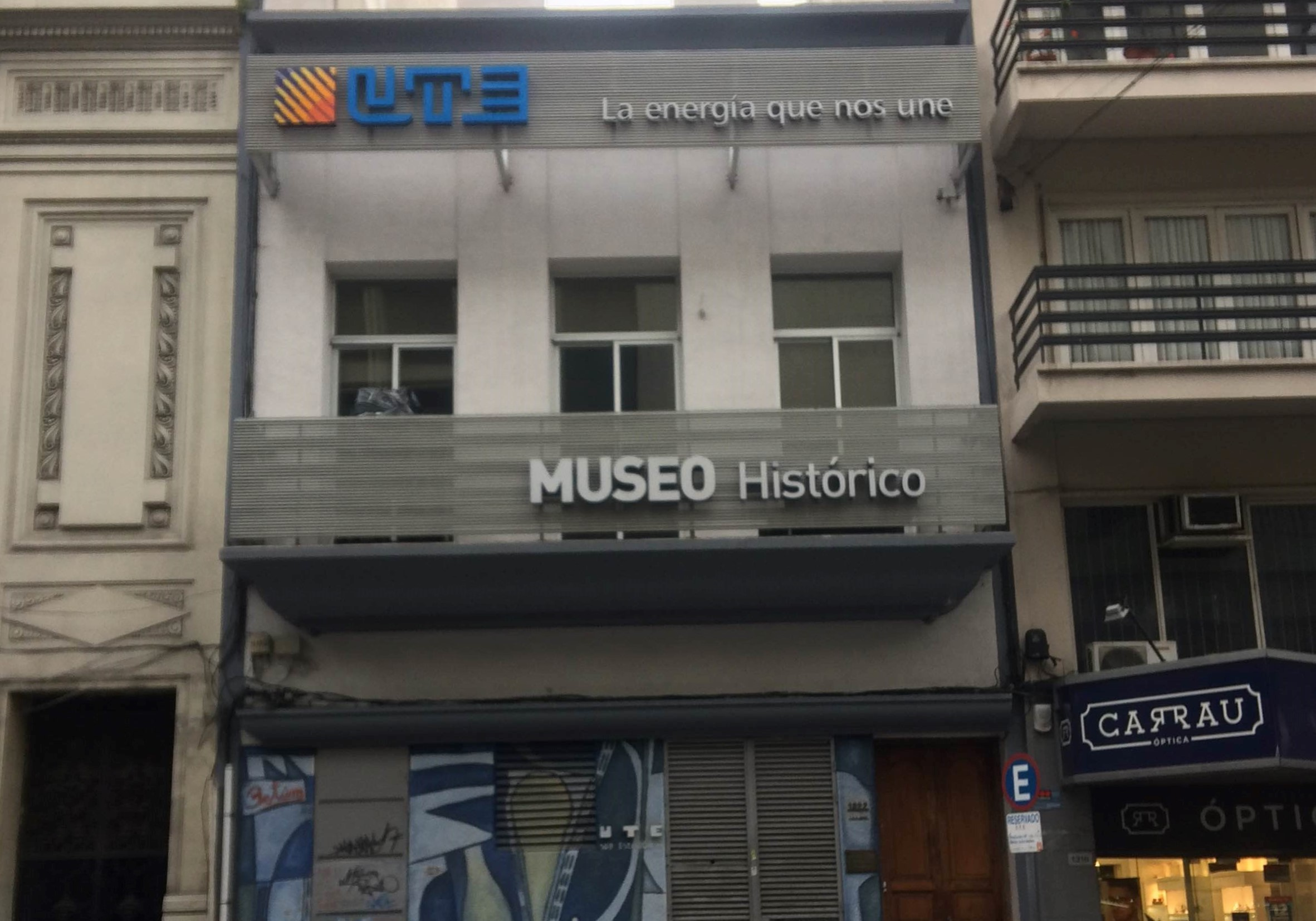
- Museo de UTE in 2016
- Established: 1 January 1992
- Location: Julio Herrera y Obes 1322; Central Montevideo; Montevideo, Uruguay
- Type: Museum
- Public transit access: 4, 77, 100, 102, 103, 105, 106, 109, 110, 111, 112, 113, CA1
- Website: Museo de UTE

The Museo de UTE is a museum located in Barrio Centro in Montevideo, Uruguay. Specialized in the history, science and technology of Uruguay, the museum is directly dependent on the UTE. It exposes diverse elements linked to the history of the Uruguayan company. To visit the museum, one must coordinate a guided tour from Monday to Friday from 9 AM to 5 PM. This is one of the museums that adheres to the day of the Uruguayan heritage. The museum has the peculiarity of being located in an old house. The collection shows part of the country's electrical history and the preservation of old parts, tools and an incandescent lamp from 1879.
