= Montero Palace =

Building in Montevideo, Uruguay

Coordinates: 34.9055°S 56.1906°W

- Palacio Montero
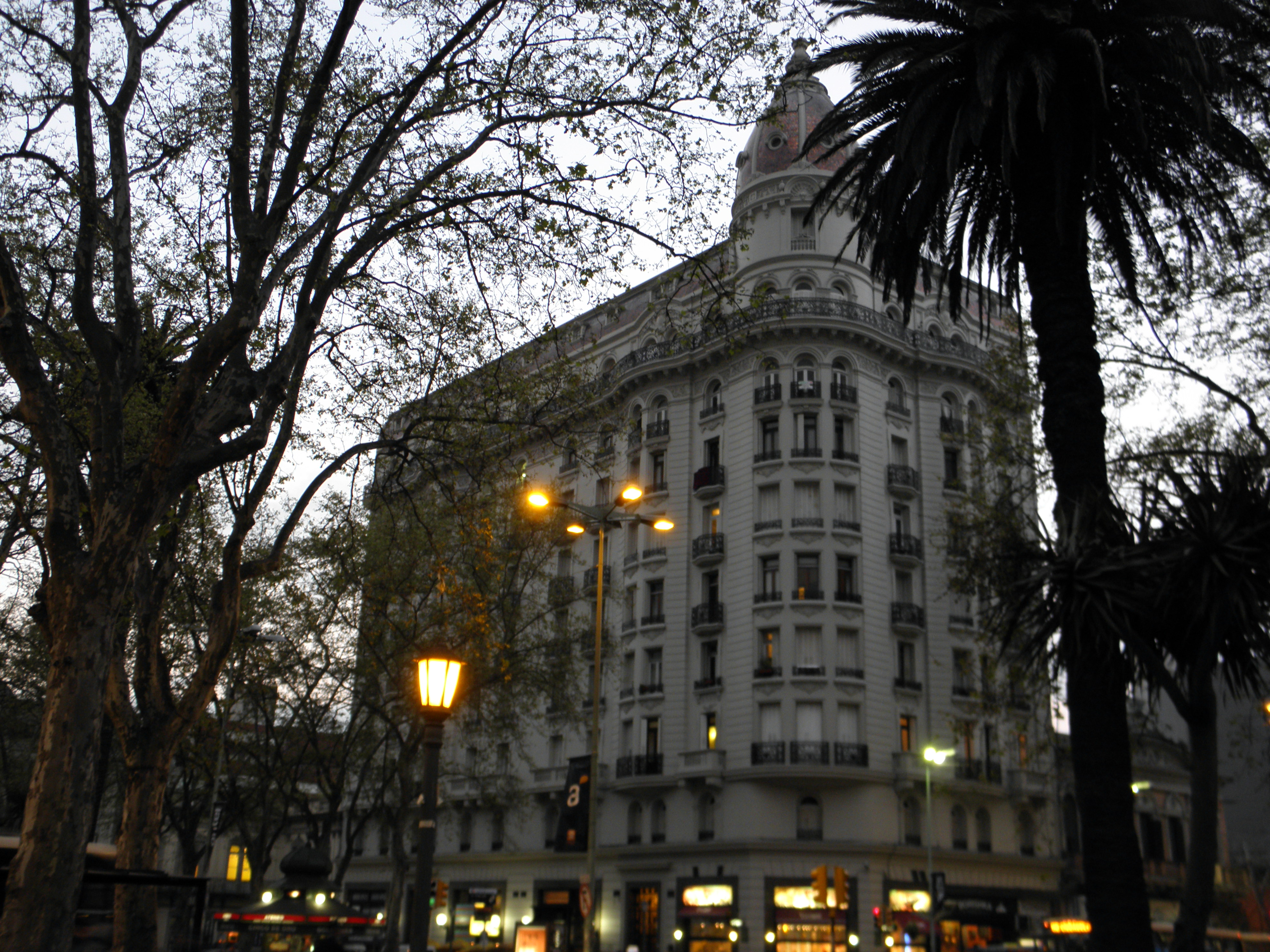
- View of the Montero Palace from the Plaza de Cagancha
- Interactive map of the Montero Palace area
- Alternative names: Edificio Sorocabana

General information
- Status: Completed
- Type: Housing; Office building
- Architectural style: Eclecticism
- Location: Montevideo, Uruguay

Design and construction
- Architect: Alberto Trigo

The Montero Palace (Spanish: Palacio Montero) is an eclectic-historicist building located in the Centro neighborhood of Montevideo, Uruguay. Built in the 1920s on the north side of Plaza de Cagancha, the building is best known for having housed the renowned Sorocabana Café on its ground floor for half a century.

== History ==
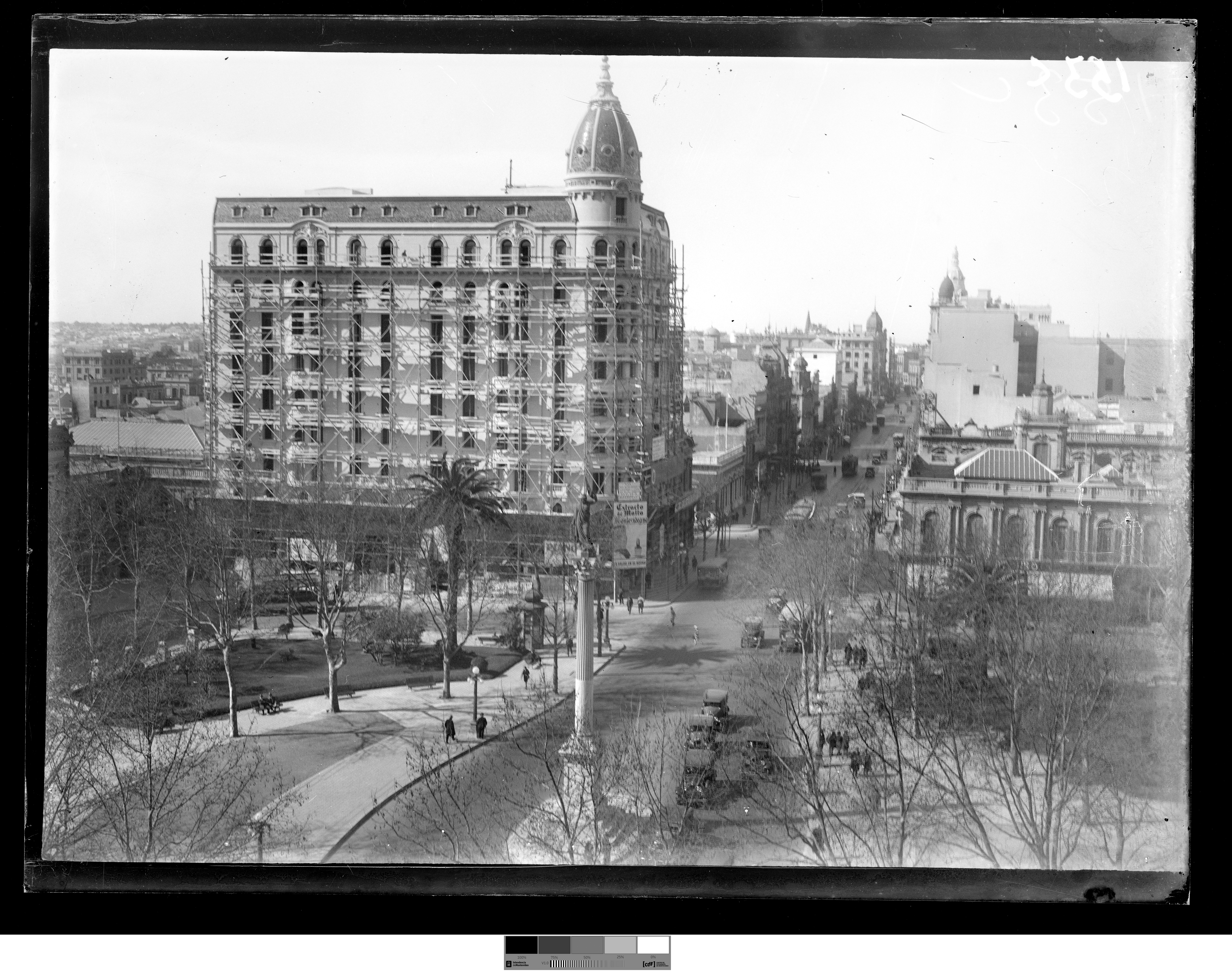
The palace under construction, 1928

The Montero Palace was designed by architect Alberto Trigo in an eclectic historicist style. The period of the 1920s and 1930s is considered part of the Belle Époque in Montevideo, marked by the construction of numerous buildings, theaters, and cafés in European architectural styles such as Art Deco and Art Nouveau.

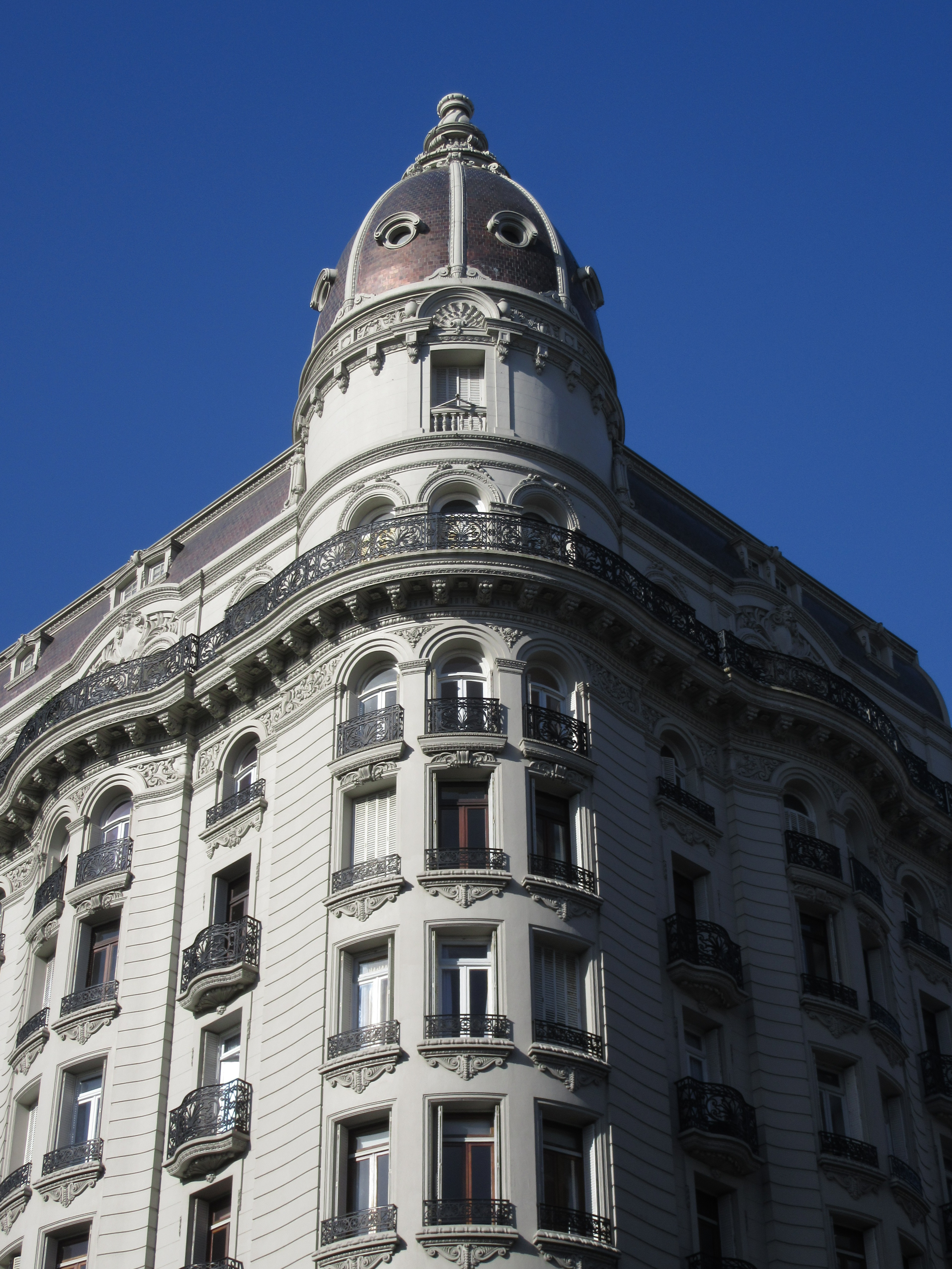
Montero Palace's dome

The building was designed as a residential complex, incorporating a commercial space on its ground floor. In 1939, it became home to Café Sorocabana, which became a prominent meeting place for intellectuals, politicians, and journalists who engaged in discussions and social gatherings. As a result, the building has been popularly known as Edificio Sorocabana (Spanish for 'Sorocabana Building') ever since, despite the café closing in 1989.

In 1995 it was designated as a heritage site by the Intendancy of Montevideo. It currently houses residences and offices, while the street level accommodates various establishments, including an ice cream parlor facing 18 de Julio Avenue and a bar-restaurant overlooking Plaza de Cagancha along its ring road.

== Gallery ==
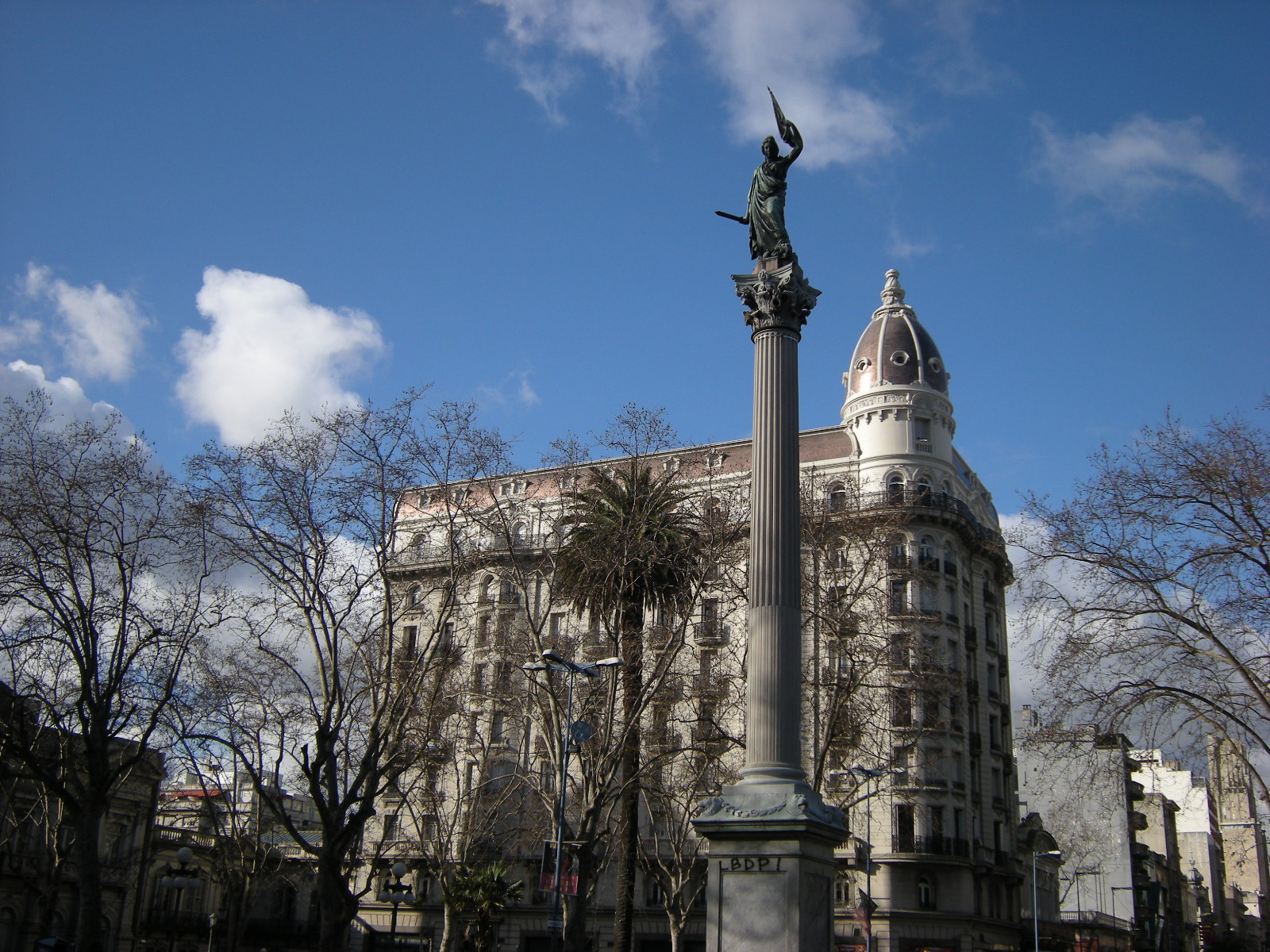
Column of Peace and the Montero Palace

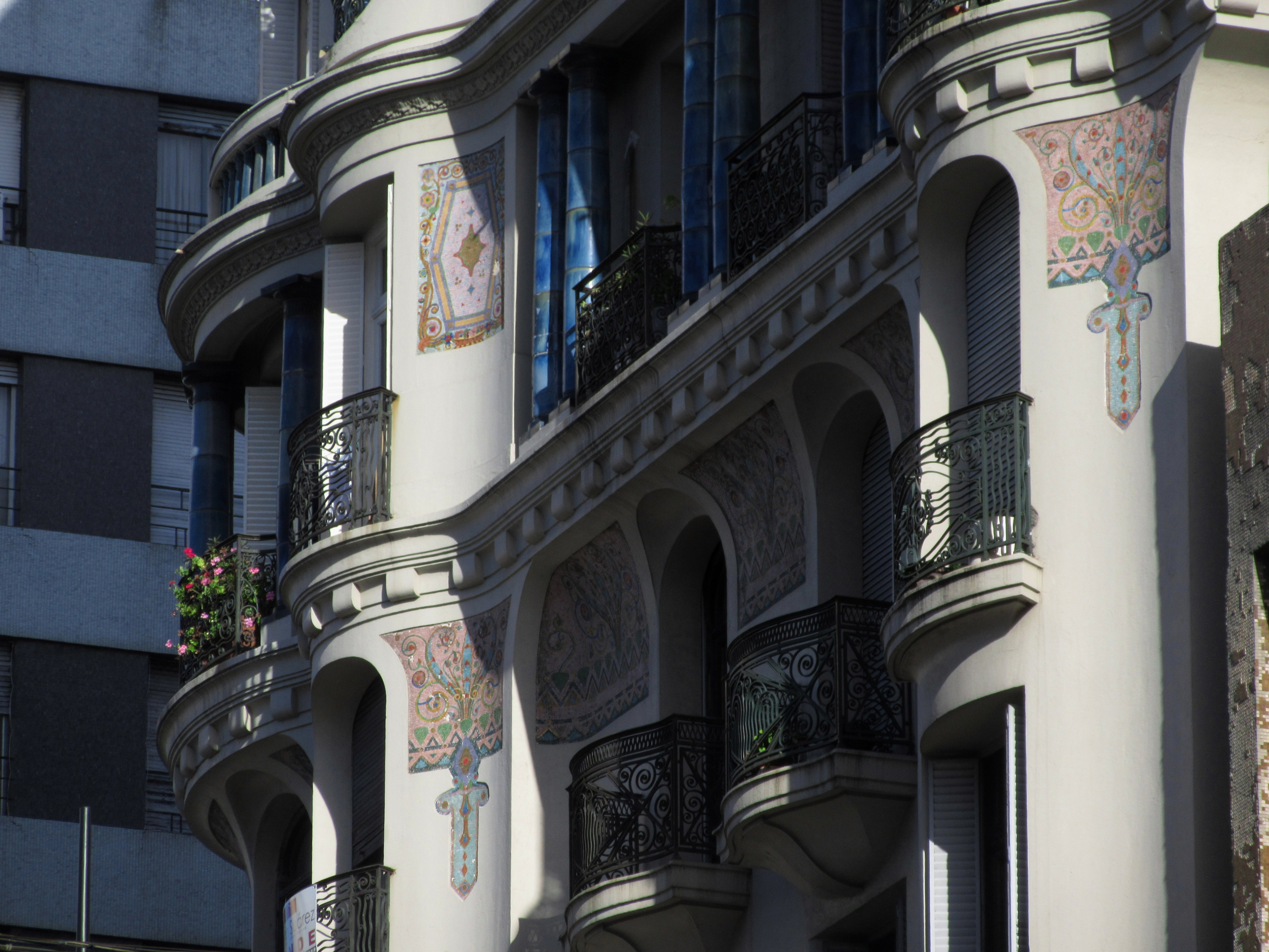
Windows on the facade
