= Montevideo Waterworks Company =

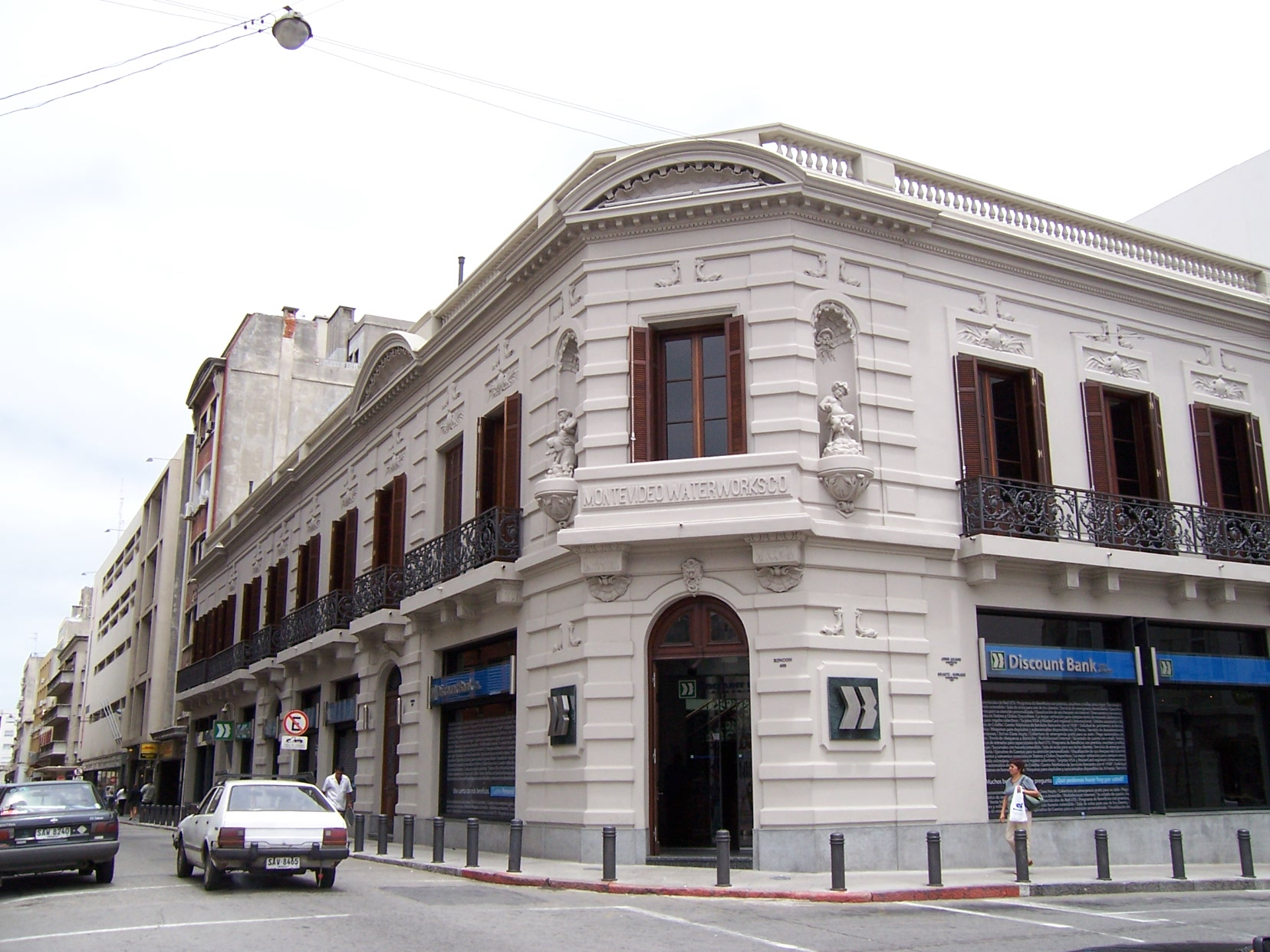
Ancient headquarters of Montevideo Waterworks Co., designed by British architect John Adams. Currently repurposed as a bank.

The Montevideo Waterworks Company, Ltd. was a British company, operating in Montevideo, Uruguay. Organized in 1879, its offices were at 61 Moorgate, London, England. The company was founded to take over a concession granted by the government of Uruguay for the construction of the necessary works for supplying the city with water derived from the Santa Lucía River. The point on that river at which the water was taken was 55 kilometres (34 mi) from the city, and after being treated with aluminoferric salt, the water was filtered and pumped through a steel main to the service reservoirs, 19 km (12 mi), on a rocky eminence at Las Piedras, at an elevation of about 90 m (300 ft) above the city. The company served nearly 35,000 houses, with the daily consumption averaging 140 litres (120 imp qt) per capita. There were six settling reservoirs, nine sand filters, two reservoirs, and five distributing reservoirs. The total extent of water mains was about 550 km (340 mi). The company assets were sold to the Uruguayan government in 1948.
