= John Adams (architect) =

British architect

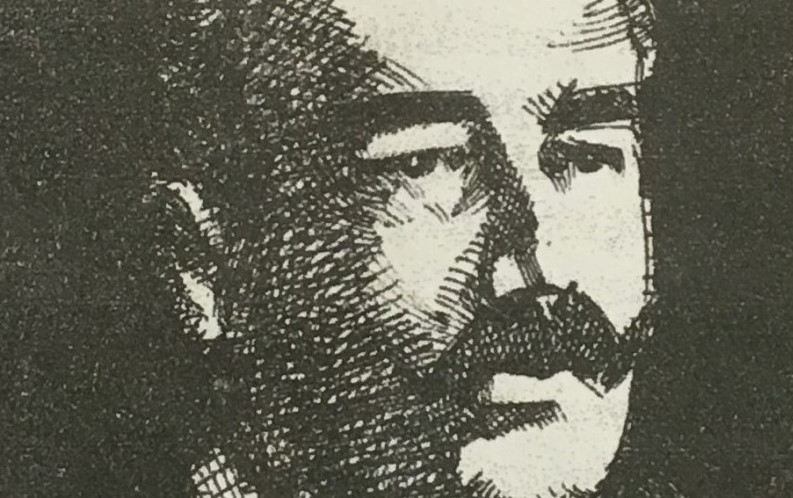
- Born: John Adams; Brighton, England
- Died: 1938; London, England
- Education: Royal College of Art
- Occupation: Architect
- Practice: Jordon & Lowether, W.S. Lascelles & Co, Maple & Co.
- Buildings: British Hospital, Edificio London París, Montevideo Waterworks Company, Gran Hotel Pocitos, Teatro Sala Verdi

John Adams (died 1938) was a British architect, active in Uruguay at the end of the 19th and beginning of the 20th century.

== Early life ==
John Adams was born in Brighton, UK, towards the end of the 19th century. He attended school in Weybridge, and later studied architecture and construction in Bath and London at the Royal College of Art. As a student, he began to work with the London architects Jordon y Lowether. After graduating from the Royal College, he was employed by the firm W.S. Lascelles & Co, remaining with them for five years.

== Emigration to South America ==
Adams subsequently found employment with Maple & Co., a British furniture and upholstery manufacturer. In 1890, he moved to Buenos Aires, Argentina, where the company had a subsidiary branch to manage the interiors of Banco de Londres y Río de la Plata (Bank of London and Río de la Plata) in the capital but also Rosario and Montevideo. He also worked on buildings owned by Banco Británico de la América del Sur in Buenos Aires y Montevideo.

== Uruguay ==
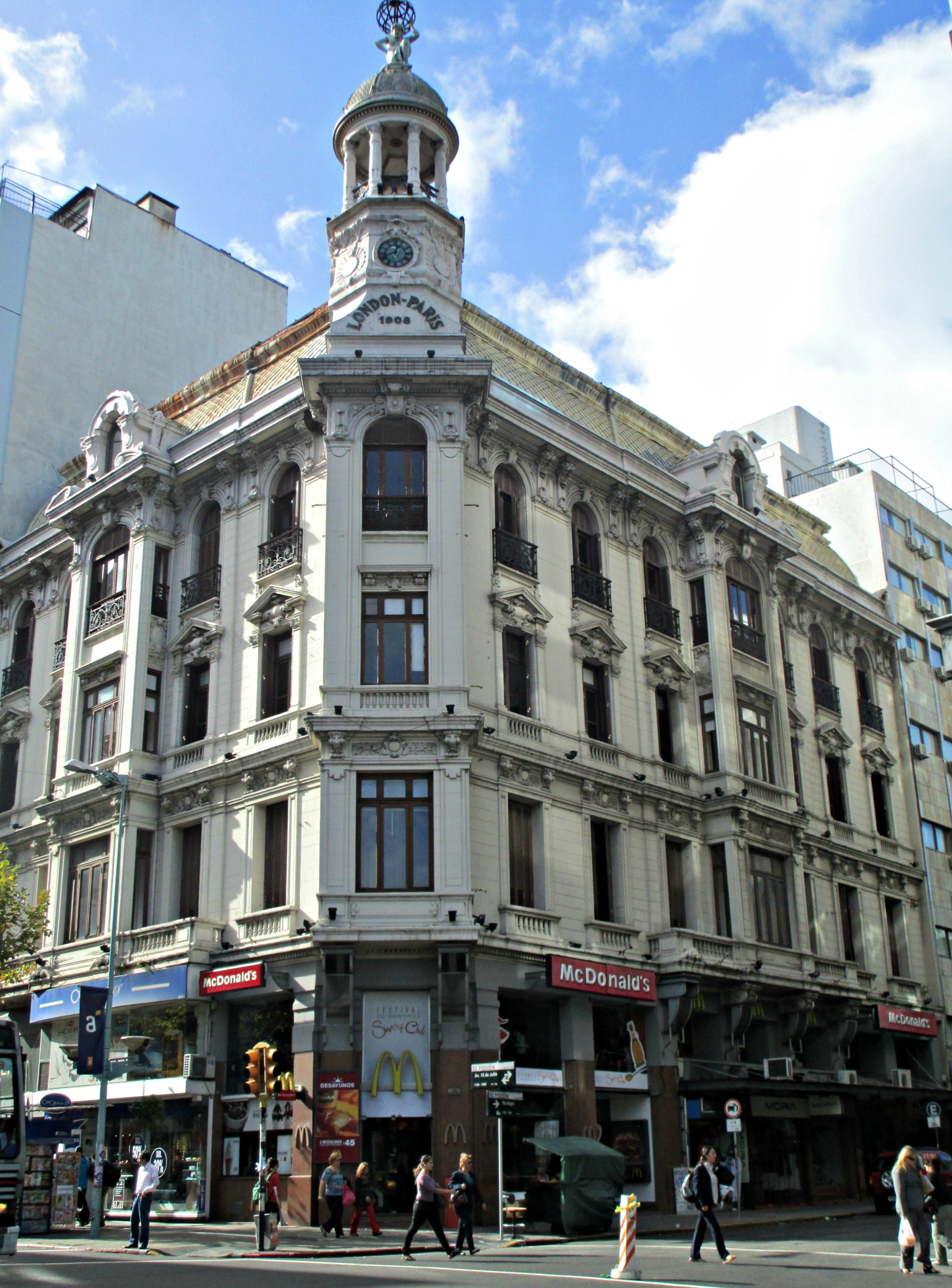
Edificio London París in 2013.

Four years after Adam's arrival in Montevideo, he had his British qualification validated in Uruguay, and began and prolific period of building activity. From the end of the 19th century through the first two decades of the twentieth century, he worked extensively in the construction of buildings, using both his own and also other architect's designs, managed by his firm. Heavily involved in the English community of Montevideo, he also delivered residential projects, hotels, and public transport facilities. From 1910 onwards, he began collaborating with Carlos Sarthou, with whom he would later form a partnership.

He left a considerable and important architectural legacy in Montevideo and beyond. Recognized as a moderniser of Uruguayan architecture, he utilised 17th century Italian traditions popular in British neoclassical contemporary design of the time. from the One of his most notable works was Victoria Hall, built in 1897 to celebrate Queen Victoria's golden jubilee. He participated in many of the English community's institutions, notably as Secretary of the British Hospital and president of the local union of architects and builders. He returned to England on many occasions, perhaps the most important with the Director General of the Uruguayan Post Office to study British post offices and their offering with the aim of improving the Uruguayan service. In the last years of his life he worked as a commercial attaché in the Uruguayan embassy in London. He died in 1938 in London.

== Selected works ==
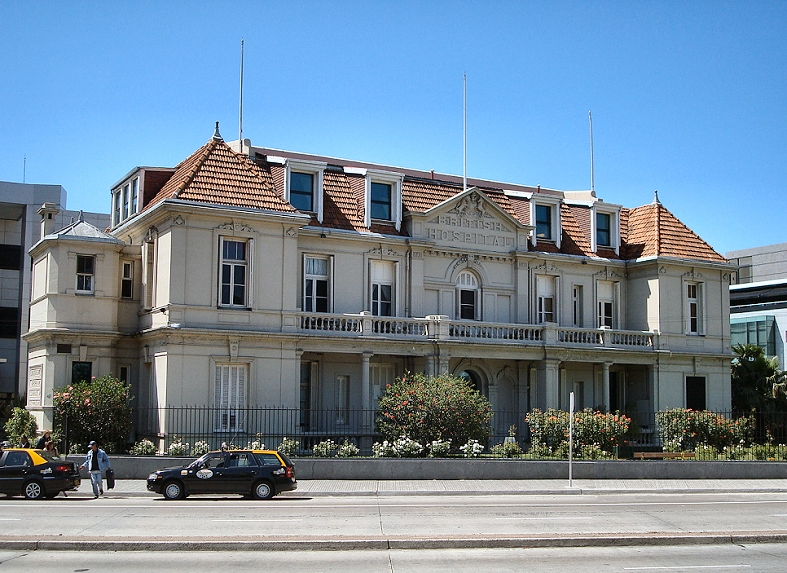
The British Hospital in Montevideo.

- British Hospital
- Edificio London París (also known as Standard Life)
- Victoria Hall
- Teatro Sala Verdi
- Montevideo Waterworks Company headquarters
- Hotel de los Pocitos
- Palacio Taranco
- London and Brazilian Bank
- British Embassy, Montevideo

== Bibliography ==
PÉREZ SANTARCIERI, Maria Emilia, Rincones de la historia. El inglés de los edificios, Diario "El País", Supplement. "El País Cultural", Montevideo 3/8/1990, N°42.p.4.
