= British Hospital (Montevideo) =

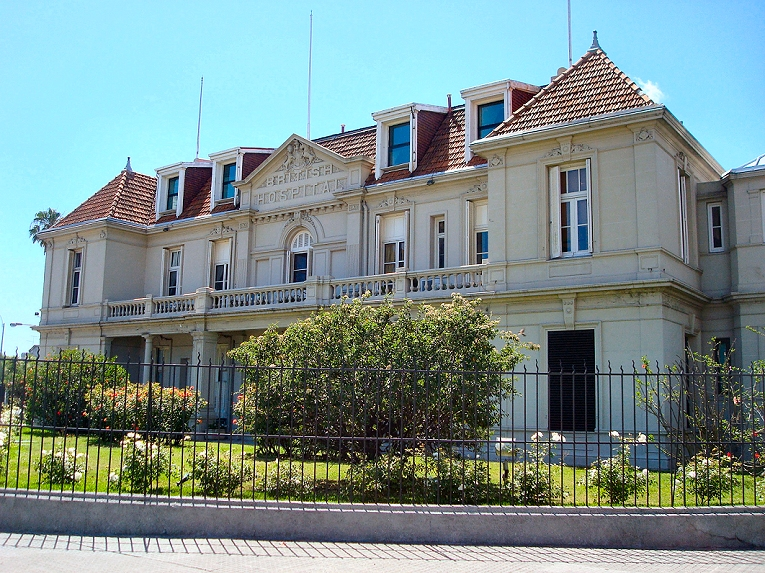
- Hospital Británico, old building

Geography
- Location: Avenida Italia 2420, Parque Batlle, Montevideo, Uruguay
- Coordinates: 34°53′41″S 56°9′45″W

Organisation
- Care system: Private, mutualism
- Type: General

Services
- Emergency department: Yes 24 hours
- Beds: 151

History
- Founded: 1857 (current location 24 July 1913)

Links
- Website: hospitalbritanico.org.uy

The British Hospital or Hospital Británico is a private hospital in Montevideo, Uruguay. It is located in the Parque Batlle neighbourhood, just west of the park of the same name.

== History ==
It was first established by the British in the Ciudad Vieja under the name Hospital Extranjero (Foreign Hospital) in 1857. It moved to its current location under the current name in 1913; British architect John Adams authored the turn-of-the-century building.

In May 2025, the Hospital opened its first building outside of Montevideo, in the city of Punta del Este, Maldonado. During the opening ceremony, Enrique Antía, the then governor of Maldonado, was present, along British Hospital authorities.

For more than 40 years it has offered a private health insurance to its members called "British Hospital Scheme."
