= Palacio Chiarino =

Coordinates: 34°54′20.7″S 56°11′31.8″W

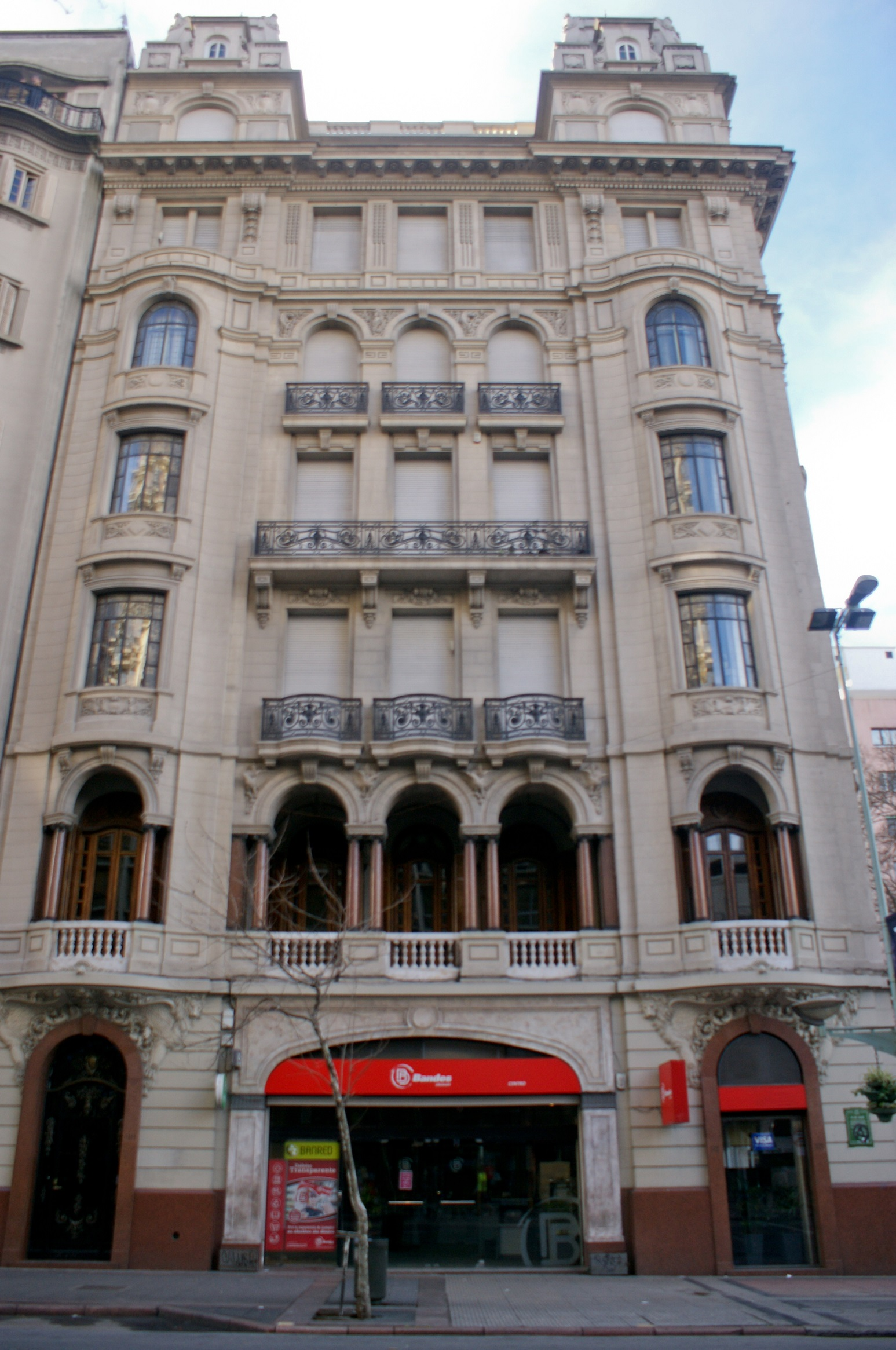
Palacio Chiarino in Plaza Cagancha

Palacio Chiarino is a French Neoclassical building located on the corner of Plaza de Cagancha and Avenue 18 de Julio in the center of Montevideo, Uruguay. Its construction began in 1922 and finished in 1928. The architects Antonio Chiarino, Bartolome Triay and Gaetano Moretti was commissioned to create the design for the Arturo Soneira family. Moretti died before the building was completed. Moretti also designed Palcio Legislativo in Montevideo, Uruguay.

Palacio Chiarino was added to the National Register of Historic Places and was declared a National Historic Landmark in 2011.

== In popular culture ==
The building has been used for international movie productions. Including:

In the film Un paradiso per due (Life in Paradise), Palacio Chiarino is used as the mansion in Rome, Italy of Charles Bramati, a wealthy industrialist where several of the characters live.
