= Centro, Montevideo =

Centro
- Barrio
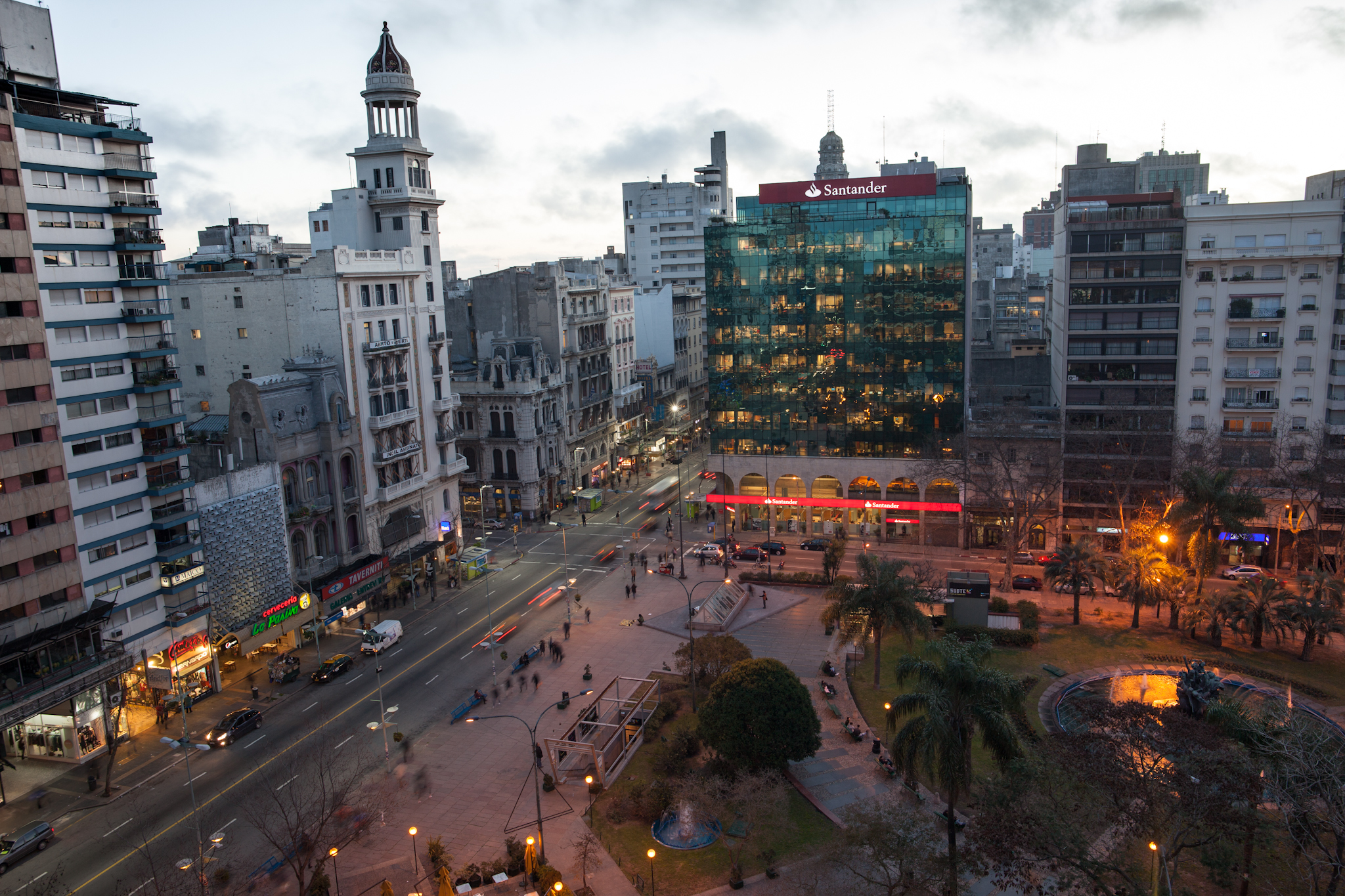
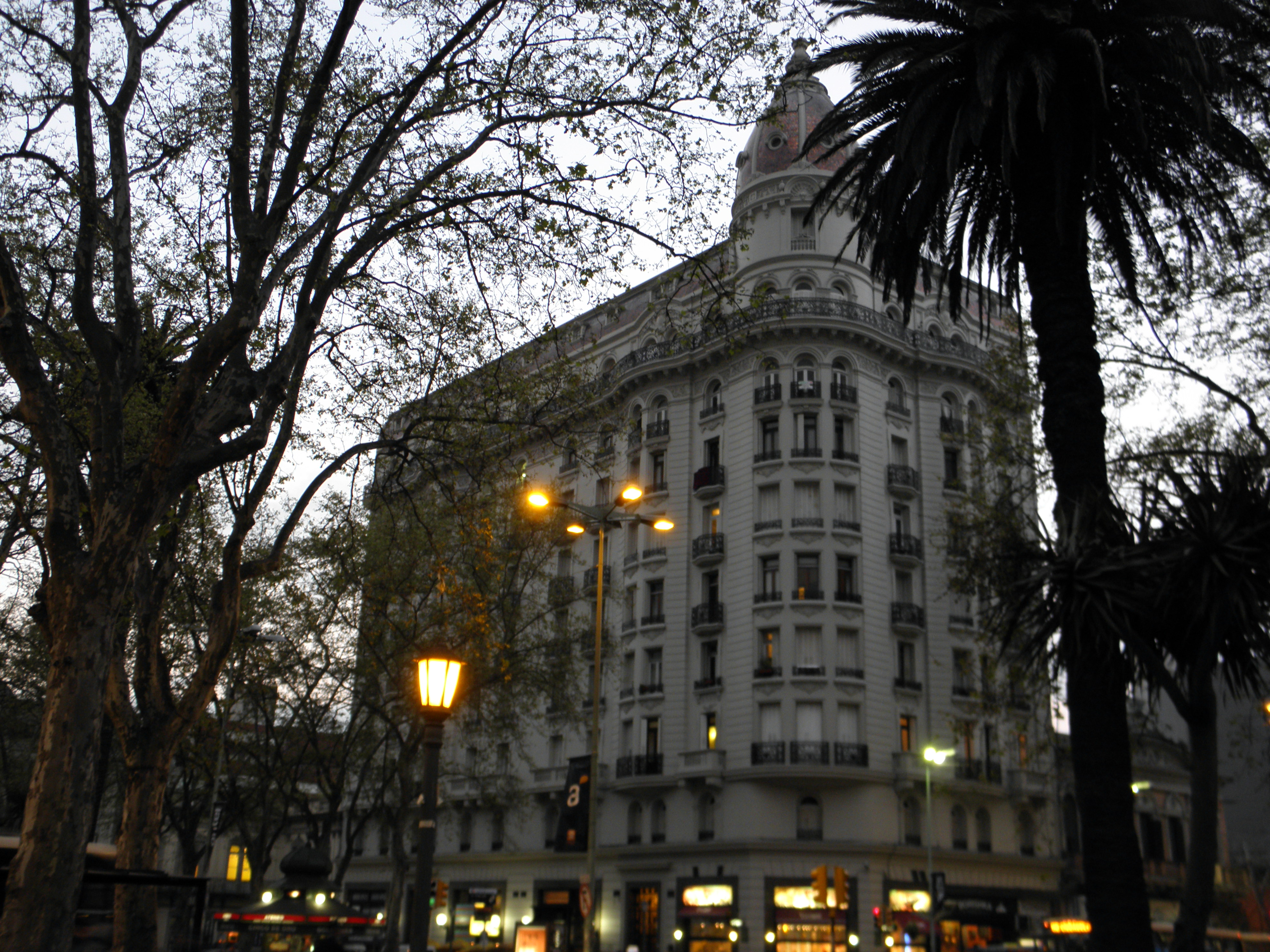
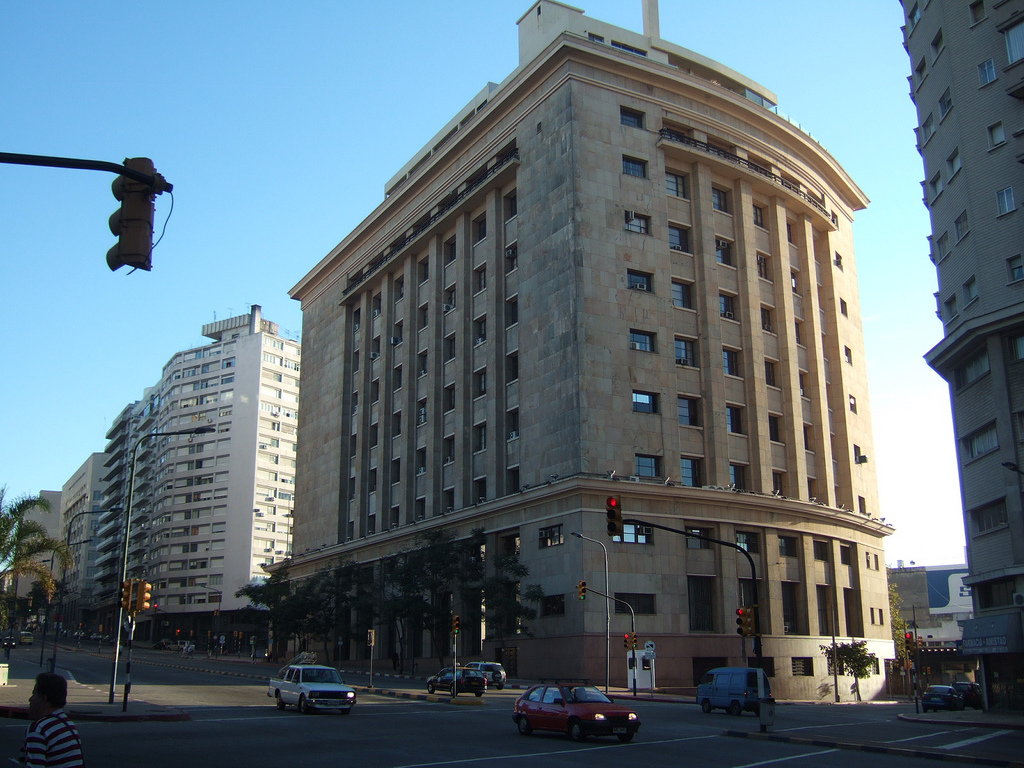
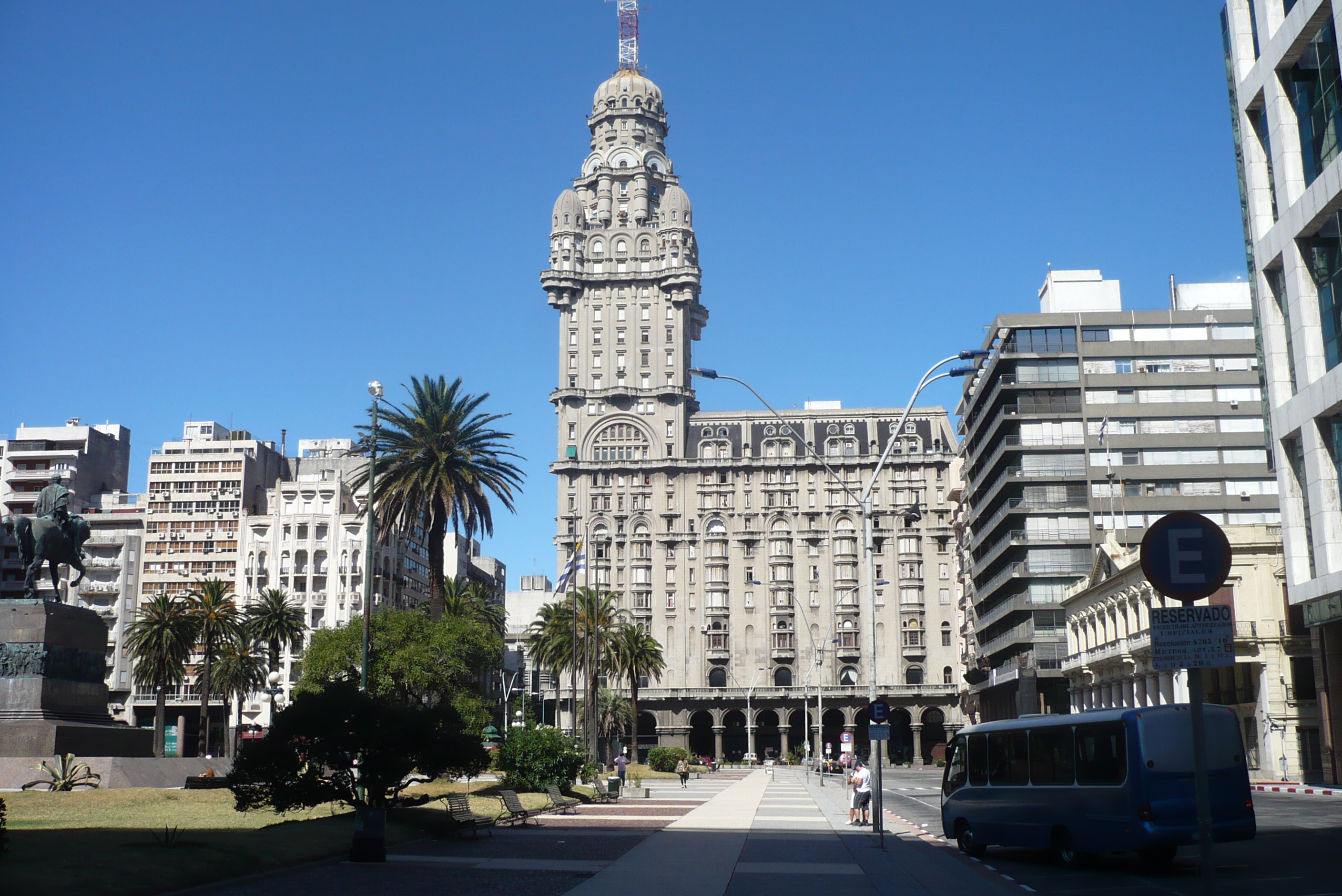
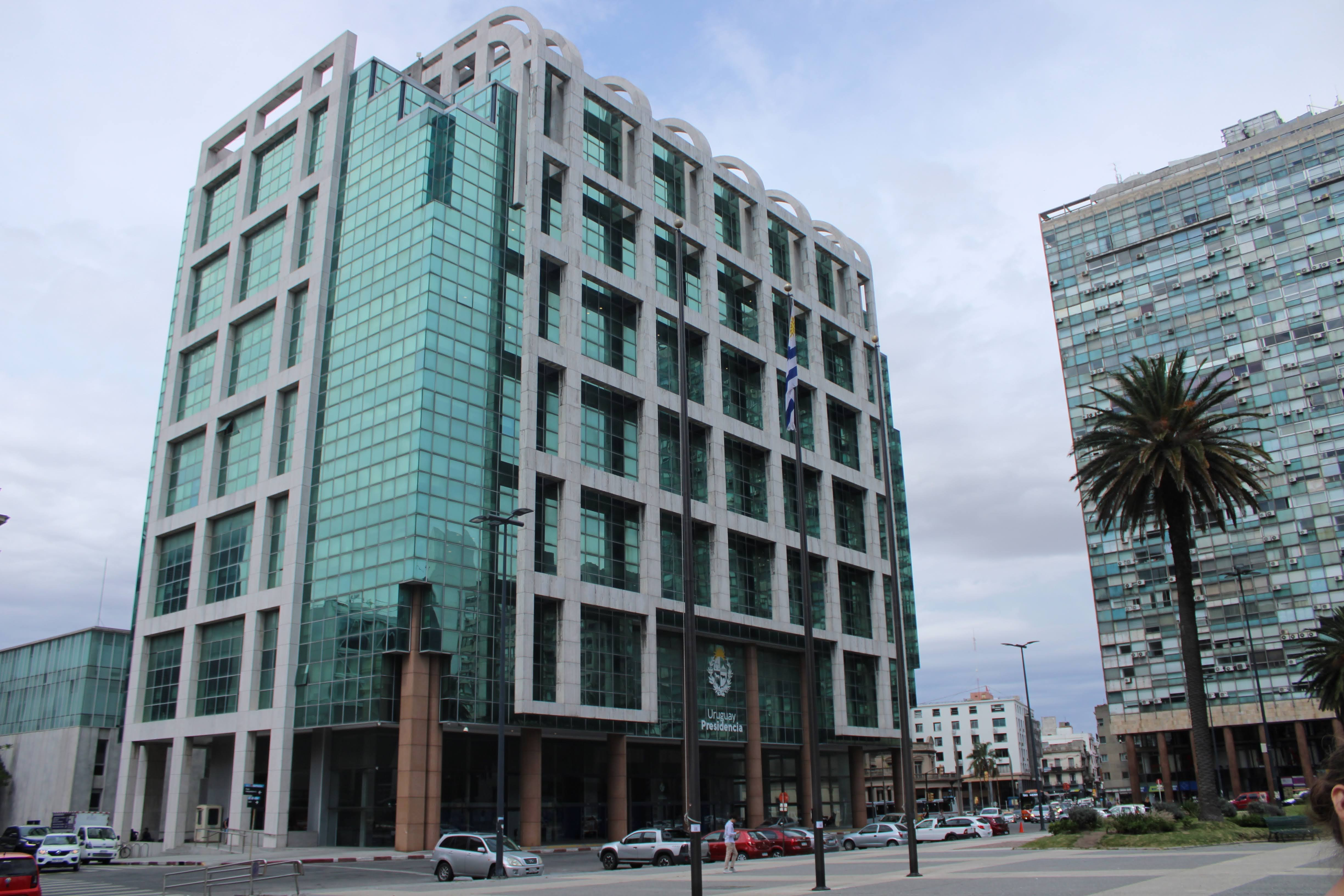
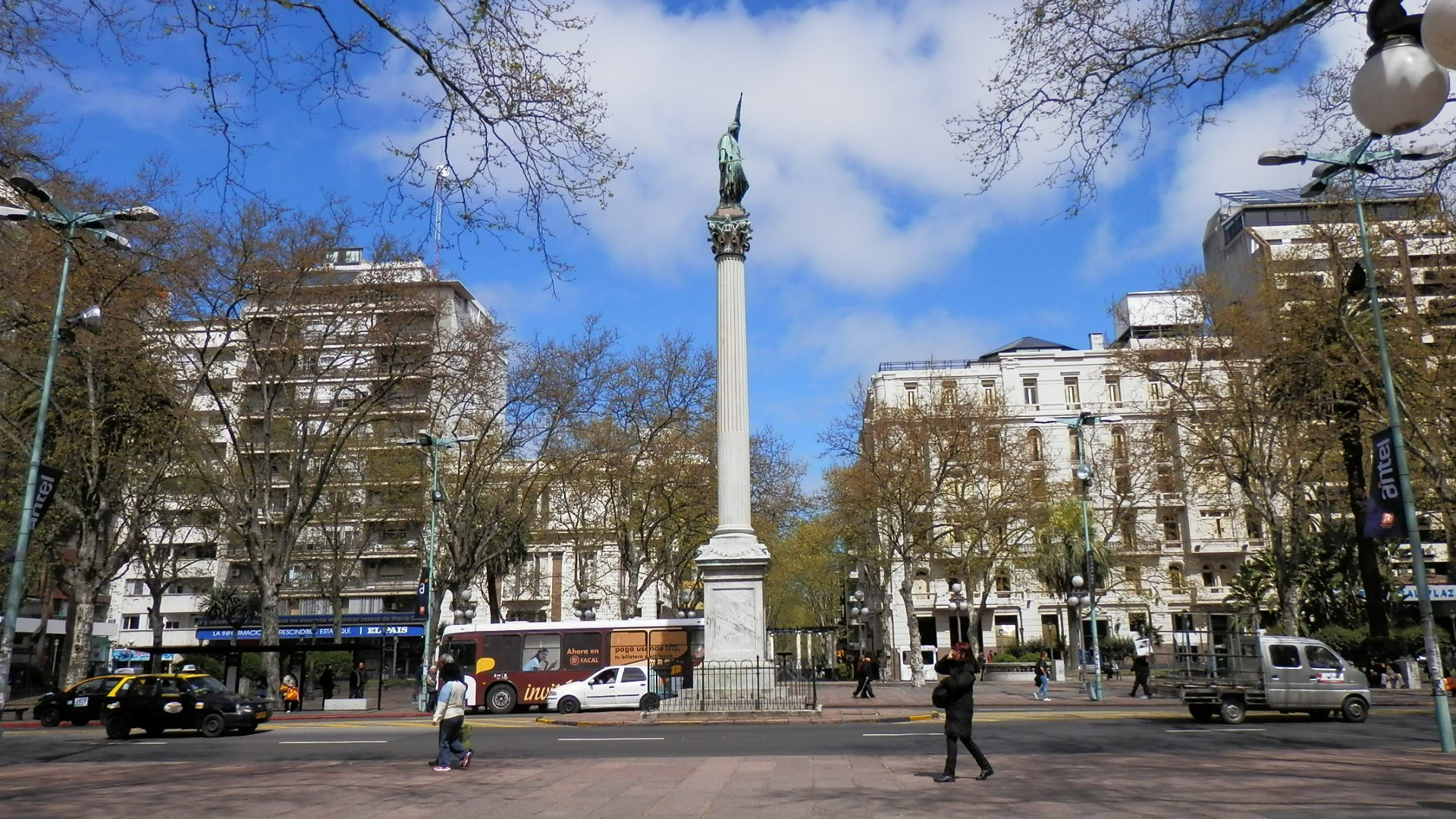
- Plaza Fabini and 18 de Julio Avenue Montero Palace ANCAP headquarters Palacio Salvo Executive Tower Column of Peace in Plaza de Cagancha

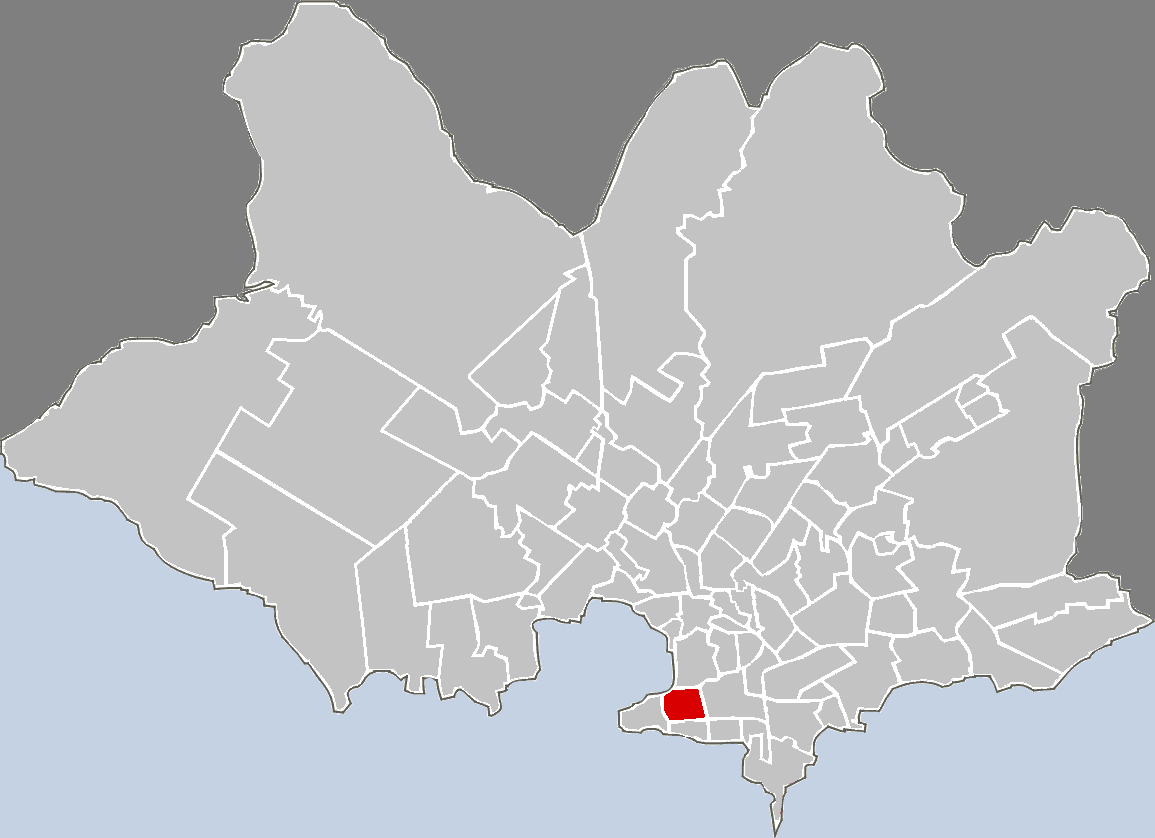
- Location of Centro in Montevideo
- Coordinates: 34°54′13″S 56°11′18″W
- Country: Uruguay
- Department: Montevideo Department
- City: Montevideo

Centro is a barrio (neighbourhood or district) of Montevideo, Uruguay. Being the city's downtown area, it forms part of its central business district, along with the neighboring areas of Cordón and Ciudad Vieja. The neighborhood stretches from Plaza Independencia to the City Hall esplanade, with 18 de Julio Avenue as its main artery. It is home to key administrative buildings, entertainment venues, commercial spaces, and cultural landmarks, making it a vital hub for both business and tourism in the city. It is also known for its preserved European architecture.

It was the first neighborhood established outside the city walls following the demolition of the fortress in the early 19th century, which is why it was initially referred to as the Ciudad Nueva (Spanish for 'New City') as opposed to the Ciudad Vieja (Spanish for 'Old City'). It is politically located in the Municipality B, in the southwestern part of the Montevideo Department.

== History ==
Rondeau St. in 1910

Due to Montevideo's military origins, for years it was forbidden to build anything permanent outside the walls of the walled city. The area outside the walls was known as "Campo de Marte" or "Ejido". However in 1829 the Constituent General Assembly of the newly created Uruguayan State approved a law that provided for the demolition of the walls of Montevideo. After this decision, the walled city became an open city, and therefore, an urban layout was made to extend it beyond the Ciudad Vieja, in what would be known as Ciudad Nueva ("New City"). The plans included a new city square, which in 1840 took on the name Plaza Cagancha. The development of this area was very slow due to the Uruguayan Civil War.

== Landmarks ==
The main sights of the neighborhood are on 18 de Julio Avenue. There are two important city squares: Plaza Fabini, commonly known as Plaza del Entrevero, and Plaza de Cagancha.

Centro is the area of the city with the greatest diversity of architectural styles, mainly European, due to the influence that the country received due to immigration. On one hand, art deco is present in different buildings, such as the Salvo, Rinaldi and Díaz palaces. On the other hand, eclecticism is evident in the Palacio Piria, seat of the Supreme Court, the Buxareo House, seat of the French embassy in Uruguay, the Jockey Club headquarters building, and the Ateneo de Montevideo, among others.

This district houses different government buildings, such as the Executive Tower, workplace of the President, the Santos Palace, seat of the Ministry of Foreign Relations, the Montevideo City Hall, the Supreme Court and the headquarters of ANCAP, the state-owned oil company.

=== Gallery ===
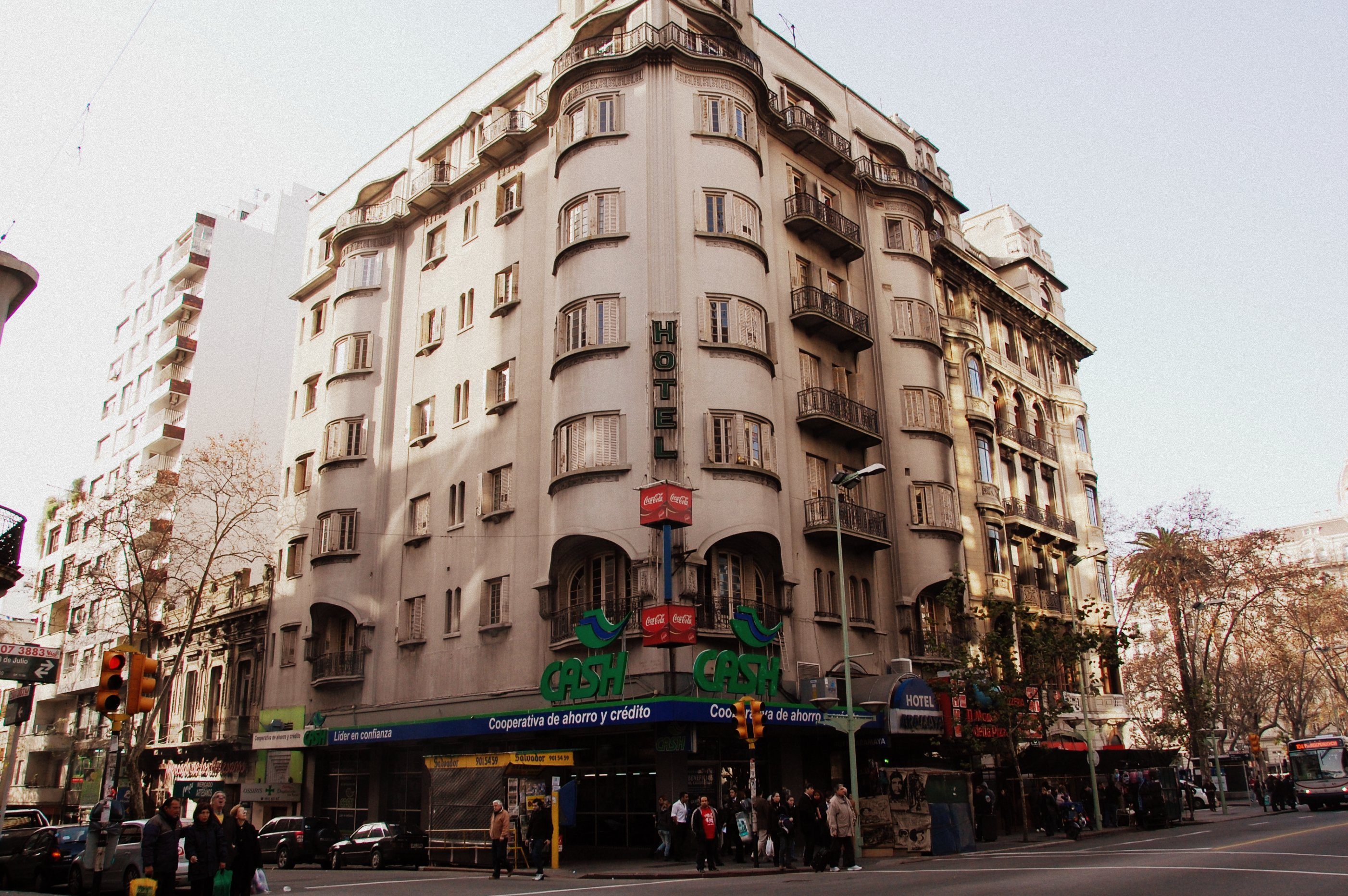
18 de Julio Avenue & Paraguay St.

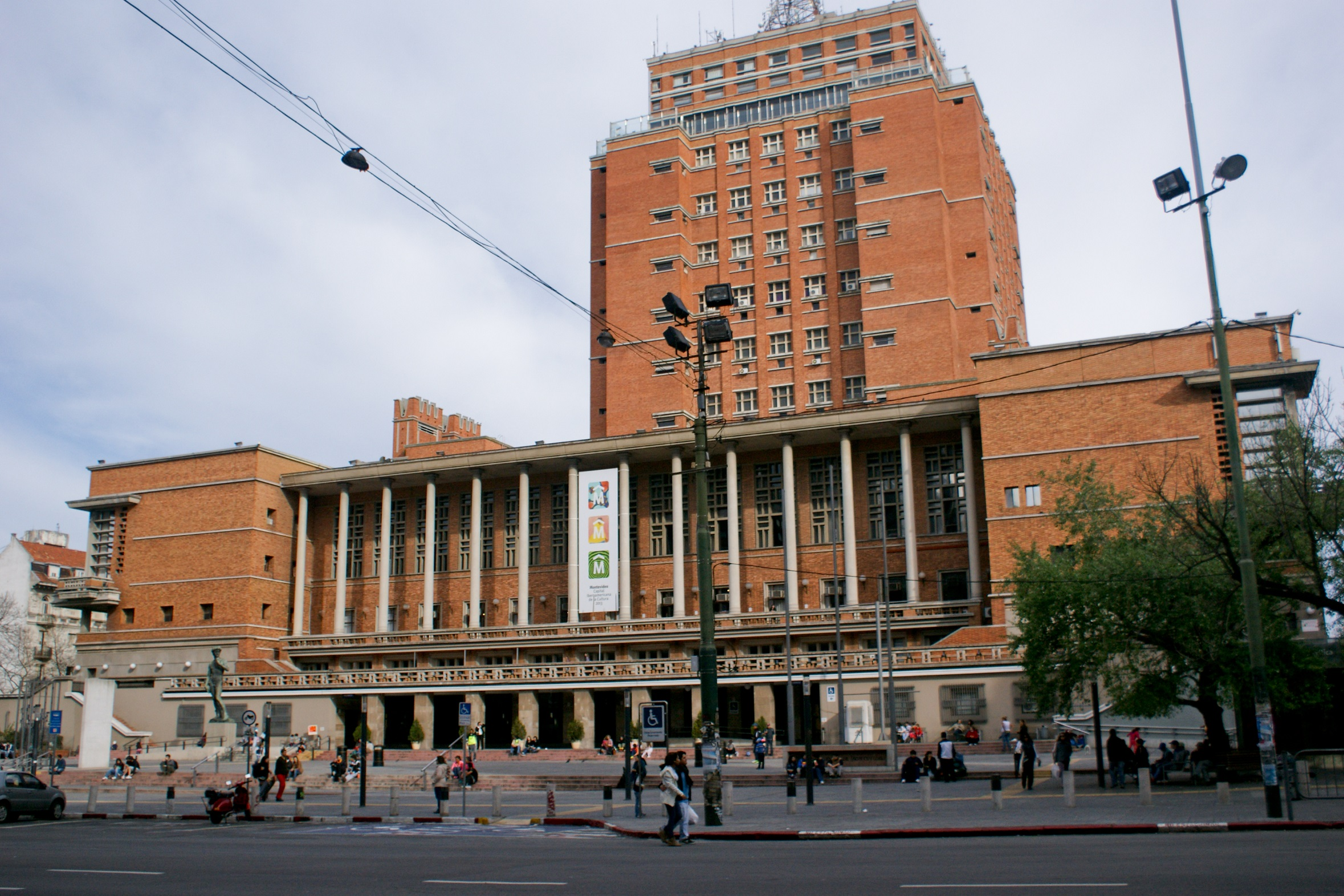
City Hall of Montevideo

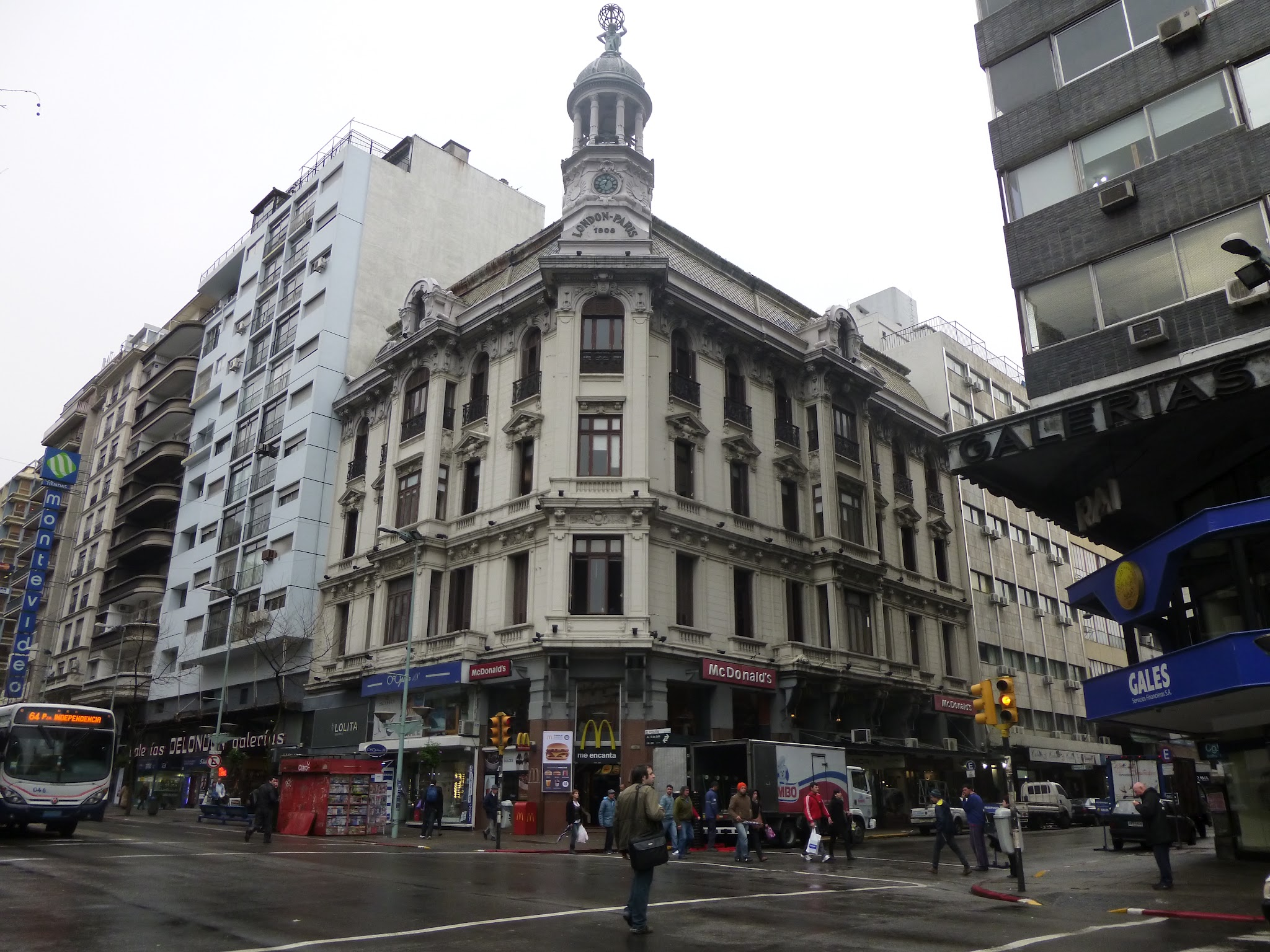
London Paris Building

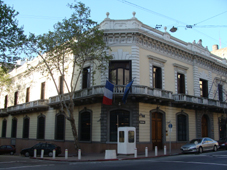
Buxareo House, Embassy of France

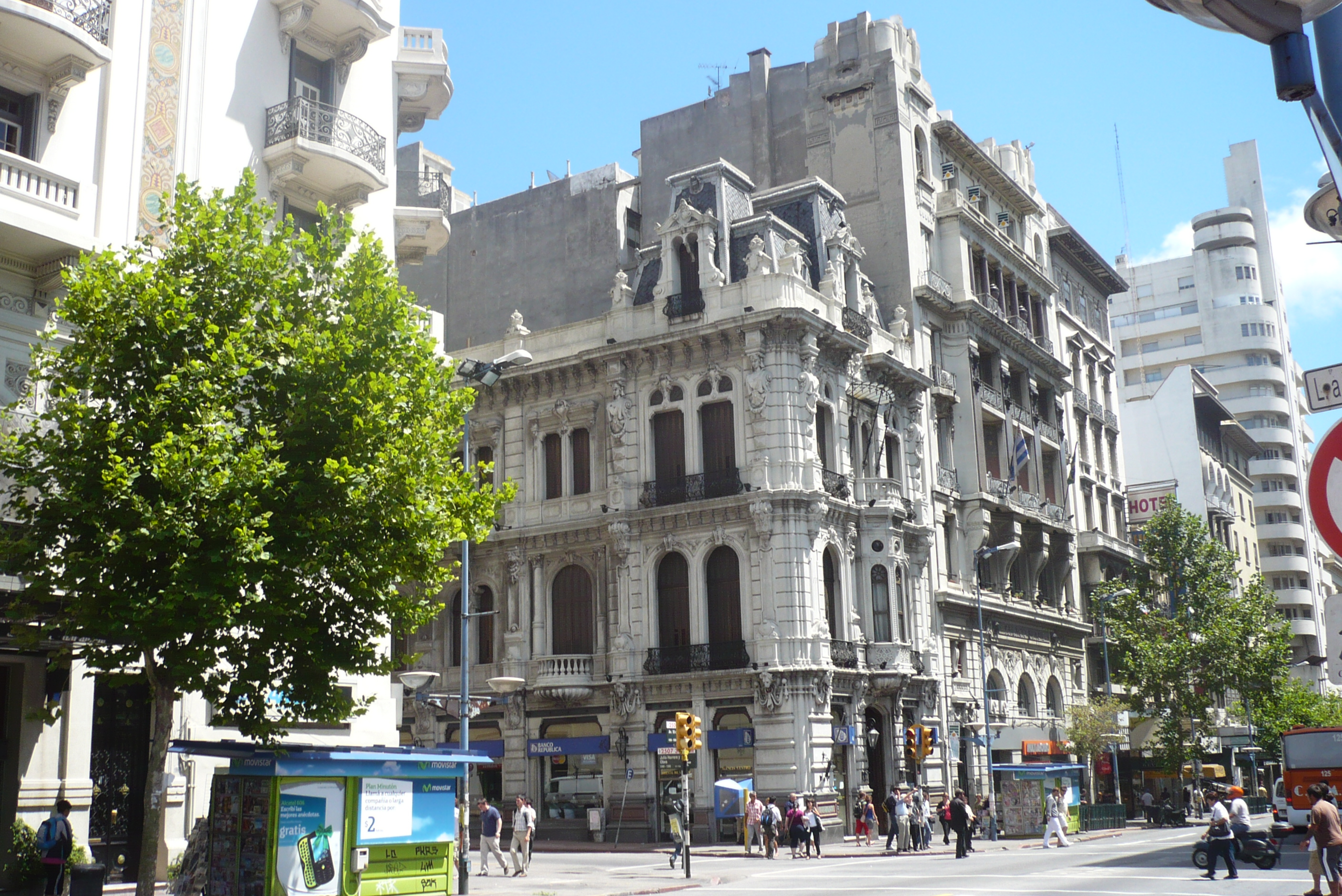
Gaucho and Coin Museum

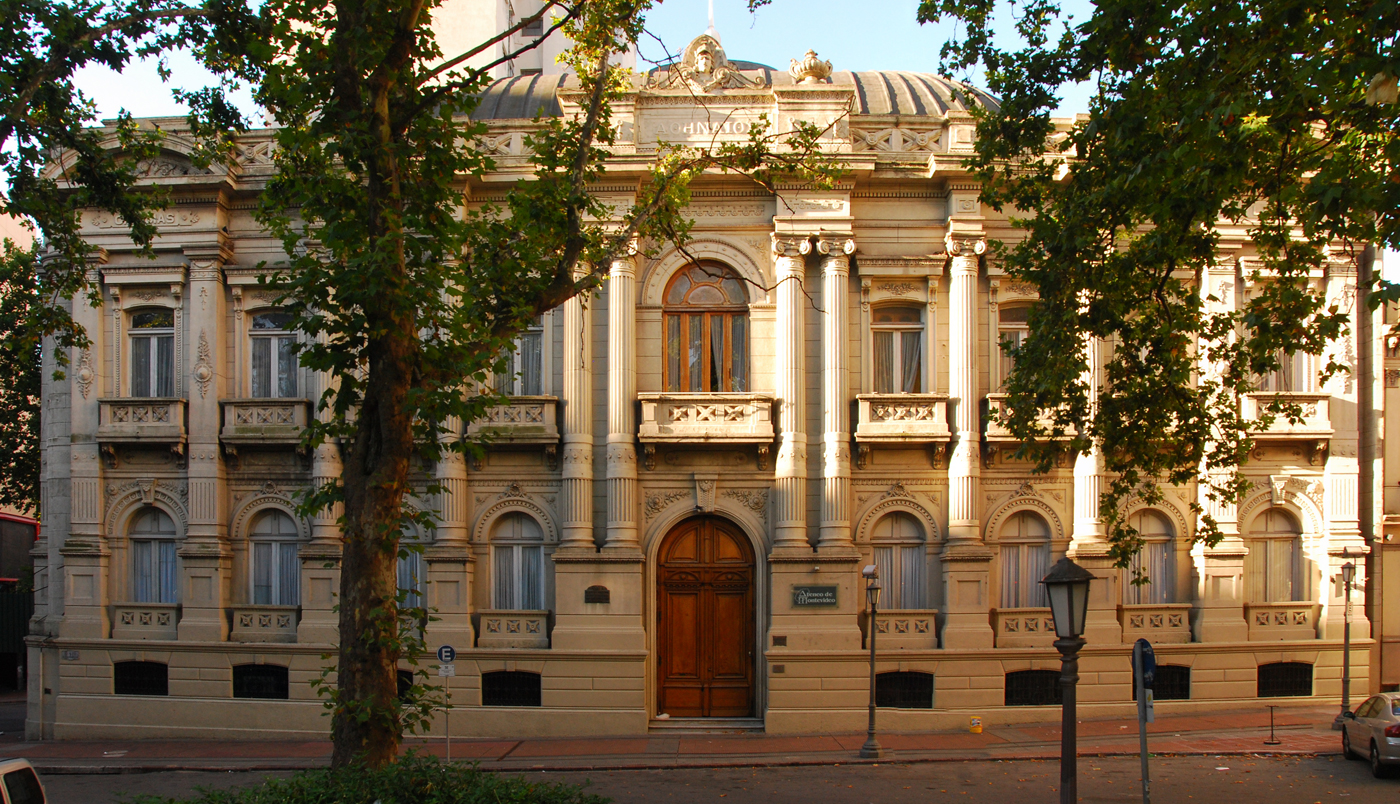
Ateneo de Montevideo

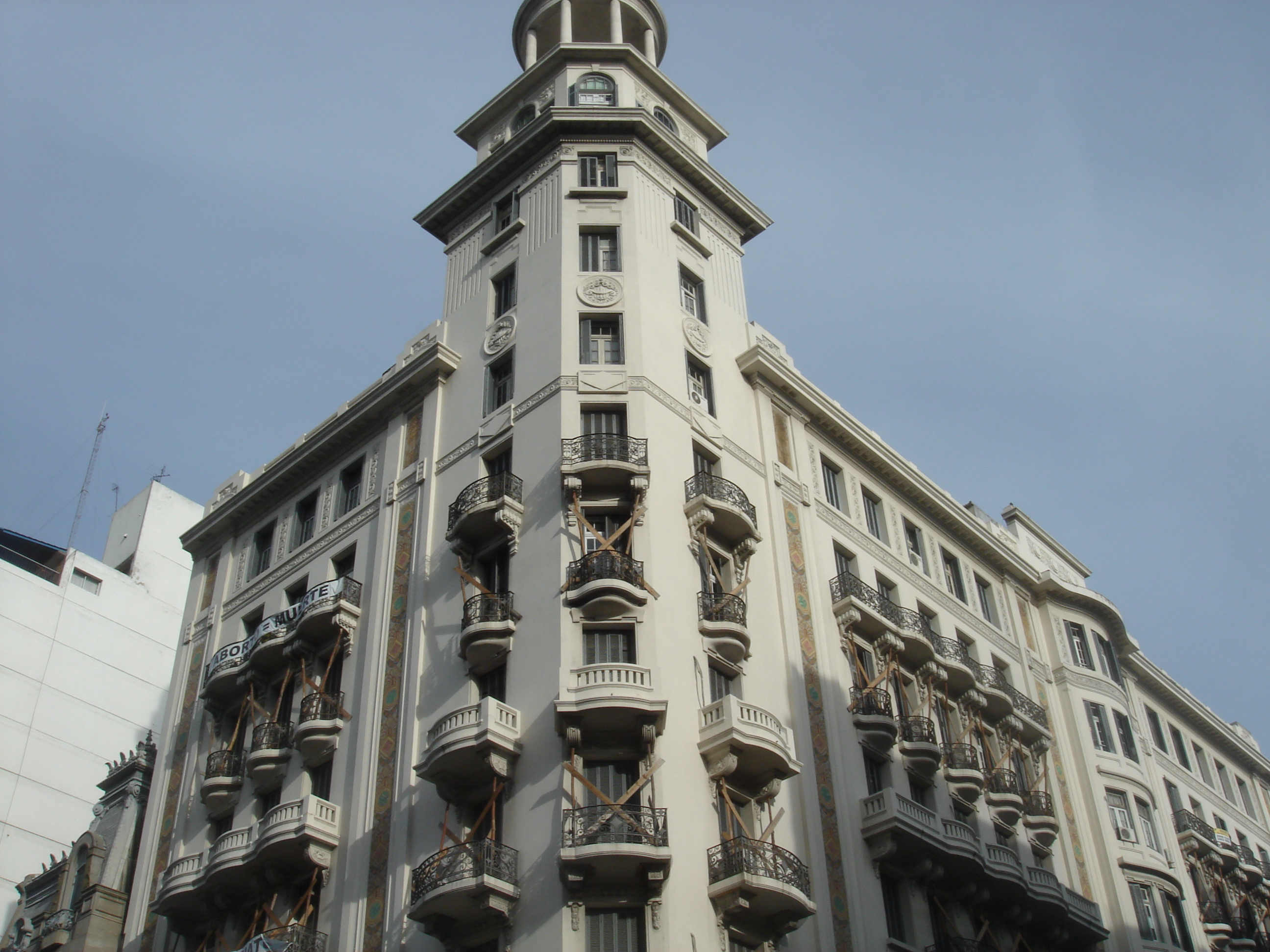
Rex Building

== Places of worship ==
Several temples have been built in this important neighbourhood.

- St. Michael Garicoits Church, popularly known as "Iglesia de los Vascos" (Roman Catholic, Betharram Fathers)
- Central Methodist Church (Methodist)
- New Jewish Congregation (Conservative synagogue)
- Vaad Ha'ir (Synagogue)
- Uruguay Islamic Center (Muslim)

== Street map and main attractions ==
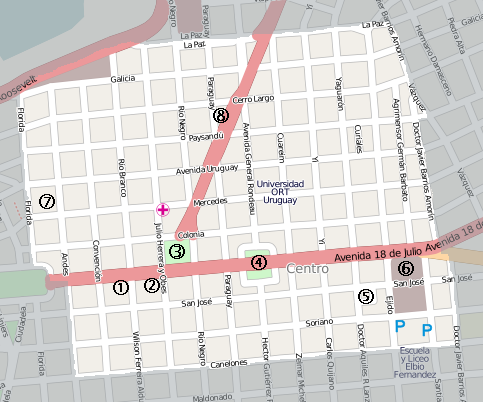

1. Edificio Lapido
2. Palacio Brasil
3. Plaza Fabini: Edificio Rex y Sala Zitarrosa, Edificio London París, Subte Municipal
4. Plaza Cagancha: Edificio Libertad, Palacio Piria, Palacio Montero, Museo Pedagógico, Ateneo de Montevideo, Mercado de los Artesanos, Palacio Chiarino
5. Mercado de la Abundancia
6. Palacio Municipal (City Hall): Michaelangelo's David (replica), Museo de Historia del Arte, Photographic Archive of Montevideo
7. National Auditorium (Symphonic Orchestra, Ballet)
8. ANCAP Building

== See also ==
- Barrios of Montevideo
