= Private stamp issues of Uruguay =

Private stamps have been issued in Uruguay by (private) companies instead of the national postal administrations. These stamps were only intended for usage for local inland delivery and were unrecognised by the Universal Postal Union (UPU). The postal services organised by the stagecoach companies, led by Mr. Lapido, started issuing stamps in 1856. These first private stamps came to be known as the Diligencia issue. A second issue, the so-called Soles de Montevideo, followed in 1859.

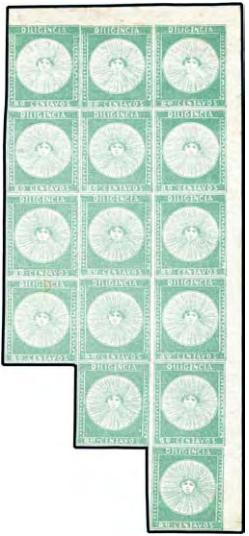
1856 Diligencia multiple, 'Ferrer block'.

== 1856 Diligencia ==
On October 1, 1856, the so-called Diligencia (stagecoach stamp) was issued by the stagecoach companies. This issue was intended for correspondence carried by stagecoach, solely for the domestic service. There were three values:

- 60 centésimos blue, for single page letters
- 80 centésimos green, for two-page letters
- 1 real red, for three-page letters.

The stamps were issued in sheets of 35, printed on white woven unwatermarked paper, in the Mège Lithograph Workshop of Mège y Willems Printing Ltd in Montevideo. The set was redrawn on 1 October 1857.

=== Postal weights ===
The tariffs for correspondence were regulated both by weight and travel distance. This last variable was abandoned when the rates approved in May 1856 became official.

Letter type	Weight
Single	4 adarmes
Double	8 adarmes
Triple	12 adarmes
Quadruple	16 adarmes

- 6 adarmes = 1 ounce = 28.7 grams

The postage could be paid by the sender or by the recipient when the correspondence reached its destination.

=== Stagecoaches and Diligencia ===
Part of article written in 1911 by Micheloni regarding the Diligencias of Uruguay:

The first postage stamps in Uruguay appeared in 1856. Prior to that, the postal administration had not adopted adhesive stamps. International correspondence was limited, as few sailing vessels traveled between Montevideo and Europe. Within the country, mail was carried by diligencias, which were large coaches that also transported passengers and baggage. A typical diligencia had space for about ten passengers inside and three more beside the driver (known as the mayoral). It was drawn by six horses arranged in a triangular formation, with an additional mounted driver and a rider alongside who used a whip to urge the horses forward.

A journey in the diligencia might be tolerable in the spring, particularly when the fresh air of the country fills the lungs of the chivalrous gauchos with the fragrance of the pampa; but during the high temperature of the southern summer or the "dog-days," I assure you that it could not have been very enjoy able; and there is reason to believe that those who had to make long journeys, particularly during the afternoon hours, must heartily have envied the inhabitants of Siberia.

The service given by the diligencias was naturally very irregular and could hardly help being so. Sometimes floods on the numerous rivers which traverse the country would carry away the balsa, a kind of wooden raft used for ferrying, and the coach would be unable to proceed; sometimes, because of rains or the roughness of the roads, the coach would upset and the passengers would have to lend a hand to the mayoral in order to right it, if they wished to continue the journey.

At that period, therefore, communication was carried on by means of these mail coaches, and the name DILIGENCIA printed at the top of the first stamps of Uruguay indicates that the mail was sent from Montevideo to the other cities of the country by them. These stamps were used solely for the domestic service."

=== 19th century controversy ===
Don Anselmo Seijó was a renowned collector at the end of the 19th and early 20th century. His most important contribution to the philately of Uruguay was the find of the "Piñeiro Archive". In the 19th century a controversy arose concerning the genuineness of the Diligencia second type issue. The Belgian dealer Jean-Baptiste Moens, supported by other chroniclers in Europe, had doubts about the official nature of the 60c second type issue, and challenged the theories of the Uruguay collectors Dr Esteban Wonner, Vasconcellos and Durante, who found copies in old correspondence.

In 1892 Mr. Seijó had the opportunity to acquire the correspondence archive of Vicente Piñeiro of Rocha, and found three covers franked with the Diligencia second type, all emanating from the merchant Sopeña of Montevideo. This find was the definitive confirmation of the genuineness of this issue and its postal use, and brought to a close a conflict which had confronted European and Uruguayan chroniclers for nearly 20 years. Mr. Seijó sold them some years later to three collectors in Uruguay, among them Dr. José Marcó del Pont.

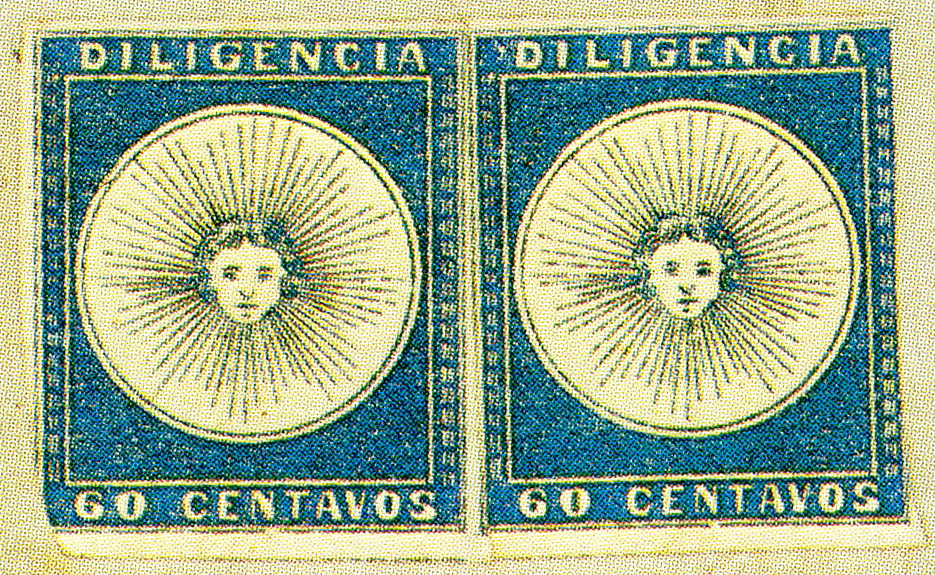
Pair of the DILIGENCIA issue, type II issued in 1857, 60 Centavos, from a cover to SALTO.

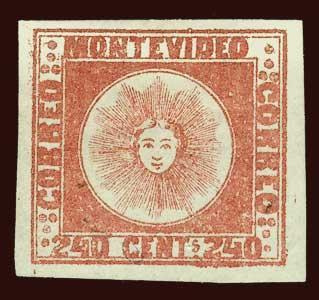
1858 240c red Sol de Montevideo issue.

== 1859-1862 Soles de Montevideo ==
Satisfied with the results achieved with the Diligencia stamps, Mr. Lapido had a new series printed in 1858 for the franking of correspondence with the Republic of Argentina. This set came also in 3 values:

- 120 centésimos blue
- 180 centésimos green
- 240 centésimos red

This issue came to be called Soles de Montevideo (Montevideo Suns) or Soles Doble Cifra (Block Type Issue), as the value of each stamp was also printed at the bottom of the stamp.

At the end of 1857, Mr. Lapido resigned from the post of Director and was replaced by Prudencio Echevarriarza, who continued the reforms of his predecessor, and presented a proposal to the government for the application of postal stamps for correspondence between every point in the country. This was approved by the government and was laid down in its decree of 11 June 1859.'

The first stamps with government approval were issued on 1 July 1859.

== See also ==
- Postage stamps and postal history of Uruguay
- Uruguay
- Stamps of Uruguay on Wikimedia Commons
