= Louis Antony Micheloni =

Uruguayan physician, fencer and philatelist

- Born: January 12, 1878; Montevideo, Uruguay
- Education: Universidad de Montevideo (1895), Escuela Superior de Comercio (1899), Montevideo
- Occupations: Physician, businessman (?)

Louis Antony Micheloni (12 January 1878 – ??) was a Uruguayan physician, fencer and philatelist.

== Early life and education ==
Micheloni was born on 12 January 1878. He received his advanced education at the Universidad de Montevideo (1895) and the Escuela Superior de Comercio (1899), Montevideo. He received the degree of M. D. from the School of Medicine, George Washington University of Washington, D. C., class of 1910, and in continuation of his studies shortly after went to Italy where he has taken a post graduate course, remaining there for a year and a half.

== Career ==
In the 1910s, Micheloni settled down in New York, making several travels back to Uruguay and some other places in Latin America.

== Interests ==
Micheloni was an artist in drawing and painting, having won first prize and high honors in the Italian School of Art of Montevideo 1904-1907. He was also interested in fencing and was a member of the Fencers Club of New York. He has won several trophies in this country and abroad and held the championship for South America. Dr. Micheloni spoke Spanish, Italian, French and English.

== Philately ==
Micheloni was a well known philatelist, interested in local philately and its organization, and the stamps of Uruguay. He was Secretary of the Uruguay Philatelic Society.

Micheloni wrote many philatelic articles regarding Uruguay philately, most of which were published in Mekeel's Weekly Stamp News, where his advertisements and short notes were also placed.

== See also ==
- Postage stamps and postal history of Uruguay
- Private stamp issues of Uruguay
