= Isla de Flores =

Uruguayan isle in the Río de la Plata

Coordinates: 34°56′39.7″S 55°55′52.1″W

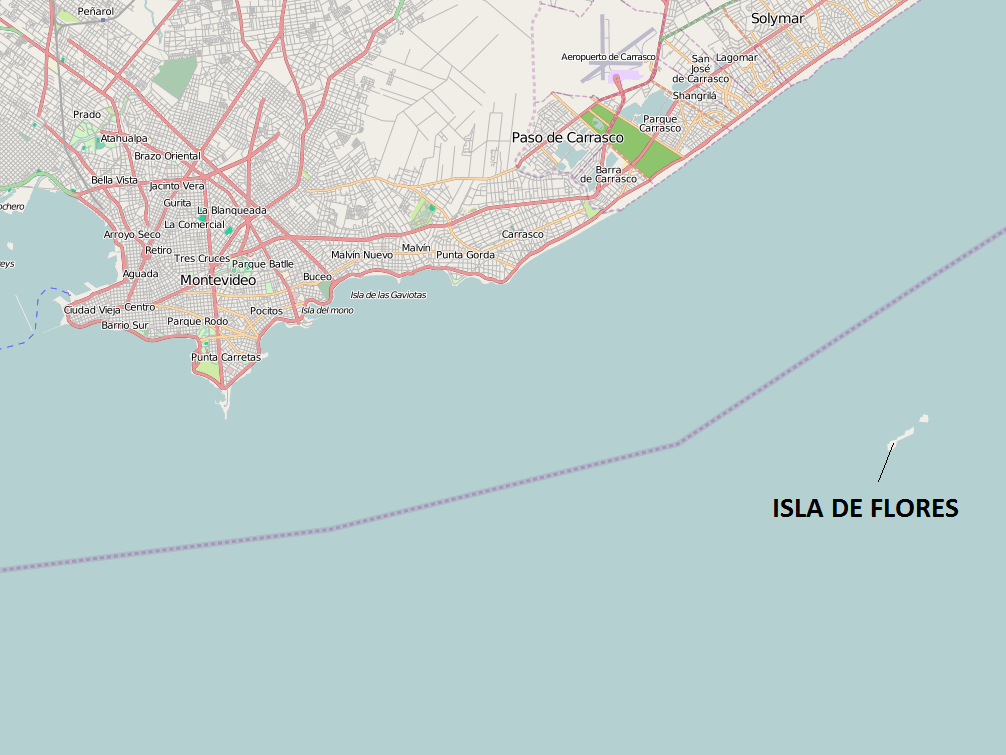

Isla de Flores is a small Uruguayan island in the Rio de la Plata, 21 kilometres (13 mi) east of Punta Carretas, Montevideo, Uruguay, halfway between the Rambla of Montevideo and the English Shoal. The island and 3.7 kilometres (2 nmi) of water around it were made a national park on February 26, 2018.

== History ==
Flores was named by Sebastián Gaboto, who discovered it on Easter Sunday 1527 (the Spanish expression Pascua Florida or Pascua de Flores, i.e. "Flowery Easter" was the reason for the name "Flores").

The island was visited occasionally by sailors. The British-born U.S. minister George Pegler recounts a short visit in about 1811 or 1812, along with the rest of the crew of the British Navy frigate Horatio. The crew named it Seal Island for the vast numbers of South American fur seals. Parties of 100 or more sailors would land on the island to hunt the seals.

Some were black, some brown, some yellow, some almost white, and others were spotted and streaked. Our custom was to land before daylight and imitate their barking, when they would invariably leave their lair where they had spent the night and make a rush for the water. We would form two lines and stand with club in hand, and as they attempted to pass we knocked them down. If the first or second happened to miss his aim some one else would be more fortunate, and before they could reach the water most of them would be dispatched. The next day we would find another path from the water to their den and obtain our game in a similar manner. Some mornings we killed more than one hundred. We took off their skins and saved the heart and liver for a fry. Every man on board had a good supply of skins, together with caps, waistcoats, trowsers, and jackets. The captain had a carpet made of different colors, for the cabin, in imitation of a lady's bed-quilt. I made myself a suit of outer garments, and picked up enough clippings of different colors to make my mother a carpet eight or ten feet square. I had the pleasure of seeing it yet in use more than twenty years after I sent it home.

As well as the abundant fur seals, the 13-year-old Pegler also noted one horse and a sheep, and speculated that they had been left on the island by General John Whitelocke when returning from the unsuccessful British attempt to capture Buenos Aires in 1807 (Pegler misdates this to 1805). Joshua Percy, captain of the Horatio and son of the Duke of Northumberland, succeeded in shooting the sheep on the crew's last day on the island.

== Lighthouse ==
Isla de Flores has a historic lighthouse, which was the subject of an 1819 treaty, by which Uruguay lost the Misiones Orientales. This lighthouse, of Portuguese origin, entered service in 1828. It was dubbed "the world's most expensive lighthouse". The lighthouse is now under the jurisdiction of the Uruguayan Navy. It is 37 metres (121 ft) tall and flashes twice every 10 seconds.

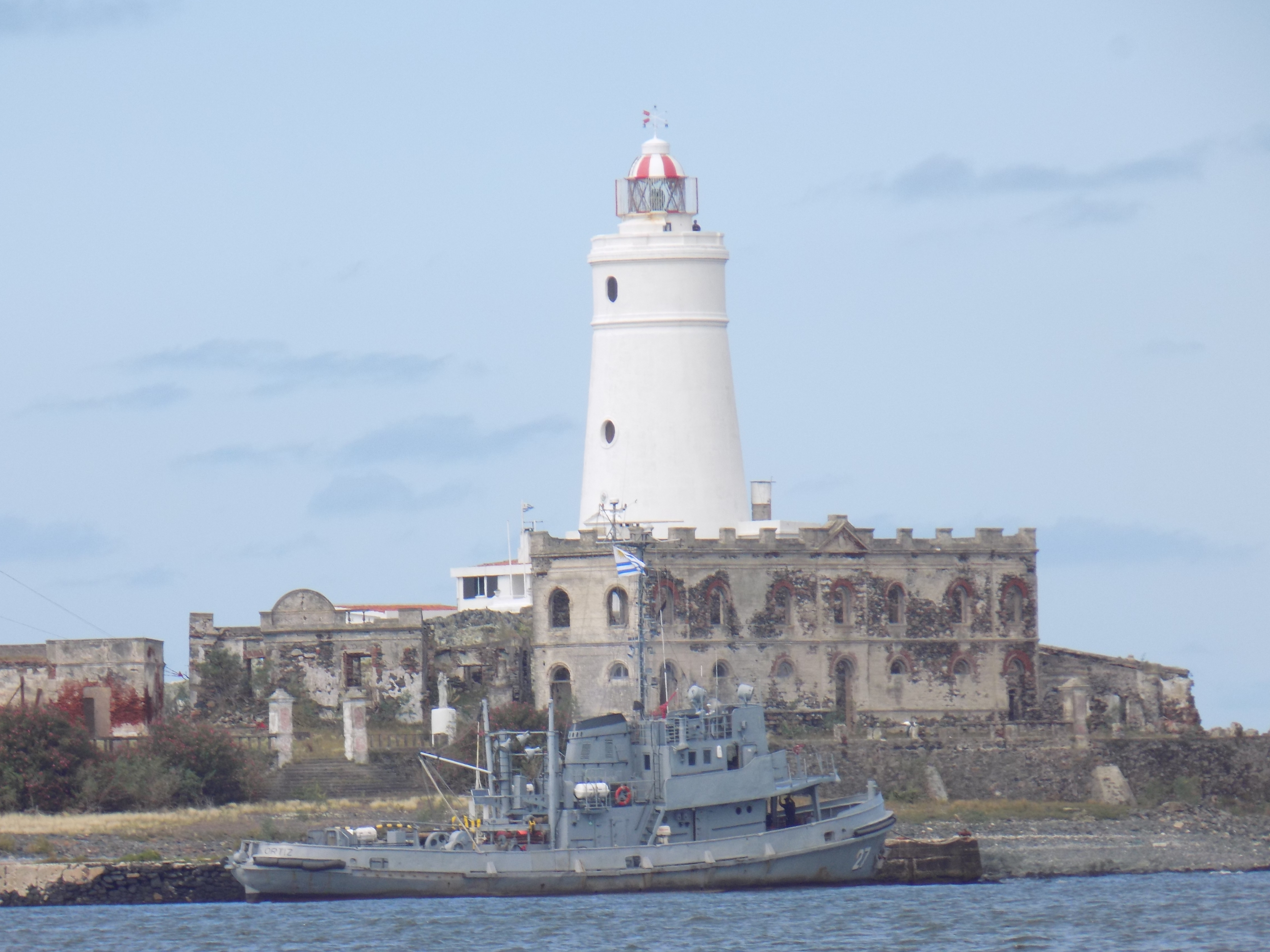
Uruguayan Navy Ship "R.O.U. Banco Ortiz" moored at dock of the "Isla de Flores", Uruguay.

== Accidents ==
On 6 June 2012, the Fairchild SA227AC Metro III CX-LAS of Air Class Airlines, performing a freight flight on behalf of DHL from Montevideo to Buenos Aires disappeared south of the island of Flores.

== Bibliography ==
- Langguth, Eduardo; Varese, Juan Antonio. Historias y leyendas de la isla de Flores. ISBN 9974759315.
