= Punta Carretas Shopping =

Shopping mall in Montevideo, Uruguay

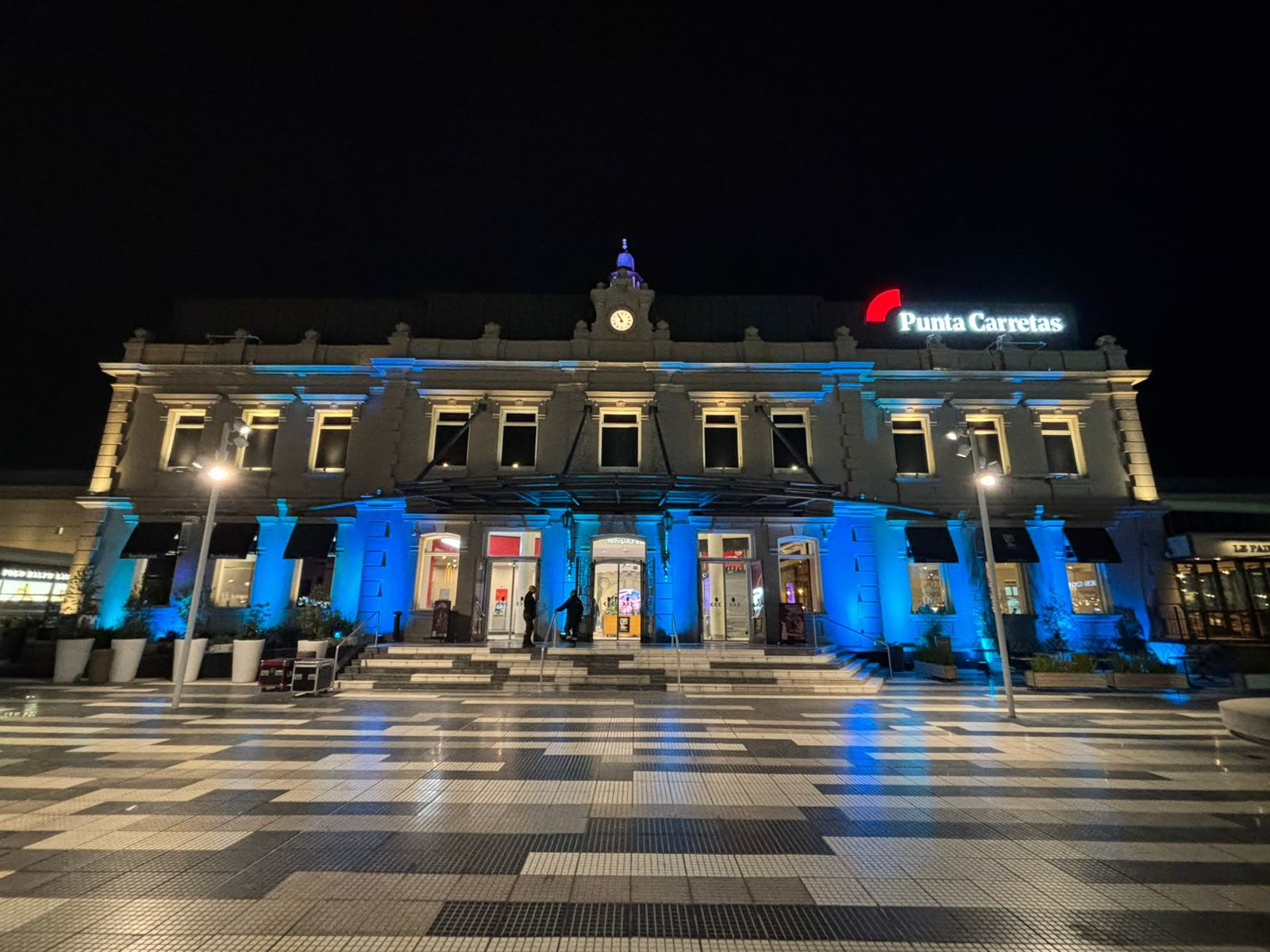
- Mall entrance
- Location: Montevideo, Uruguay
- Coordinates: 34°55′27″S 56°09′30″W
- Address: 350 José Ellauri Ave, Montevideo
- Opened: 1994
- Architect: 1905-1915 Domingo Sanguinetti; 1992-1997Juan Carlos López y Asociados, Casildo Rodríguez
- Num. of stores: 210
- Floors: 3
- Website: www.puntacarretas.com.uy

Punta Carretas Shopping is a shopping mall in Montevideo, Uruguay. It is located in the neighborhood Punta Carretas.

== History ==
The shopping center is located in the Punta Carretas Penitentiary building, originally opened in 1915. For decades, this penitentiary and the Church of Our Lady of the Sacred Heart were the only important buildings in the neighborhood. In 1971, in a turbulent time for the country, the spectacular flight of more than 100 prisoners took place, Tupamaro guerrillas. Towards the end of 1986, after an imposing mutiny, it was evicted and remained empty for a few years. In 1992 it was decided to start recycling and remodeling the property. The old Penitentiary opened its doors as the Punta Carretas Shopping in 1994.

== Recycling Project ==
The recycling project was by the Argentine architect Juan Carlos López (author of Galerías Pacífico, Patio Bullrich and Parque Arauco) and the Uruguayan architect Casildo Rodríguez. The shopping mall is made of stone and masonry, it has 210 stores, 4 escalators and 3 conventional ones. The arch and the exterior façade of the prison remain.

== Image gallery ==
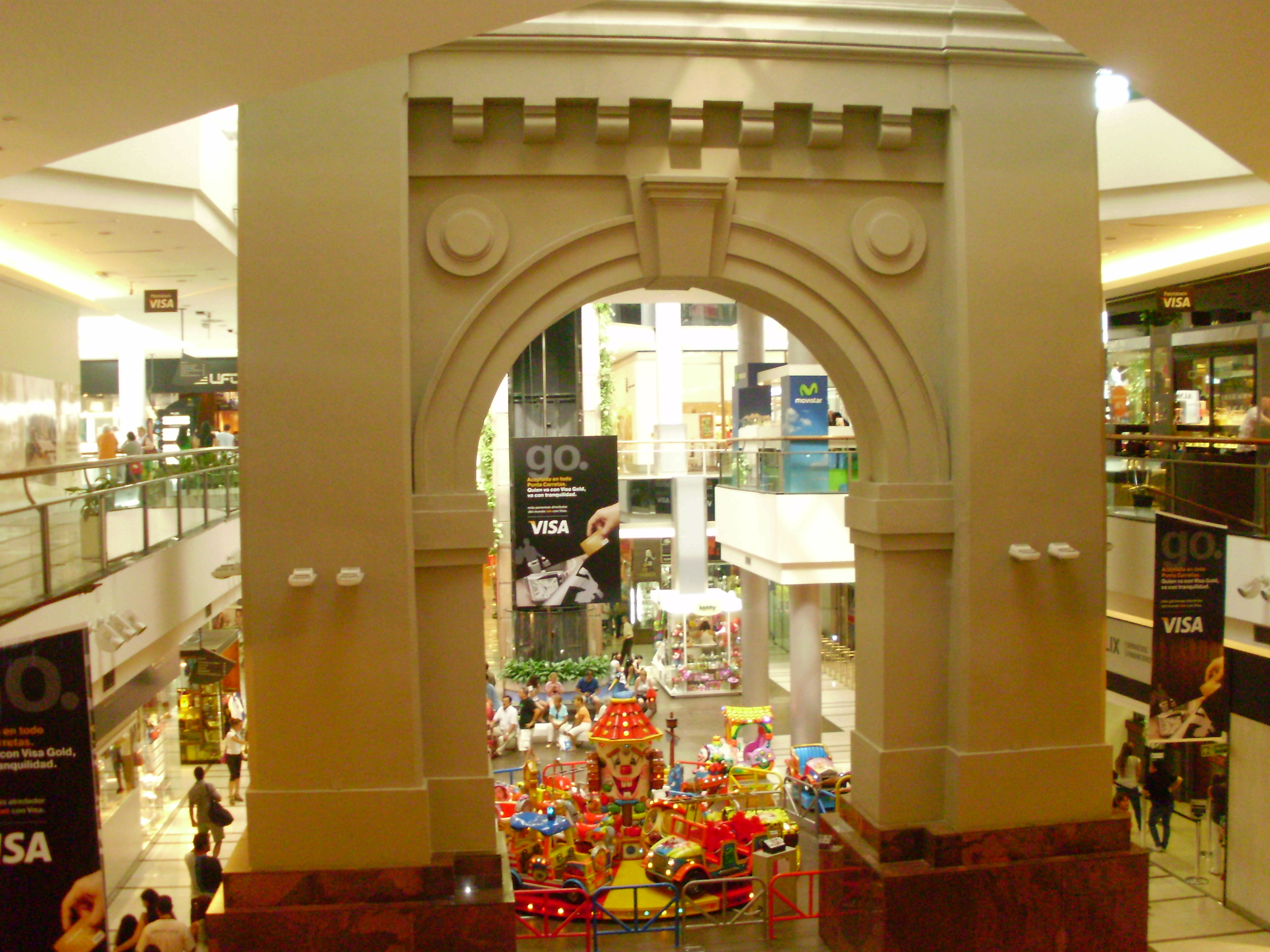
Arch

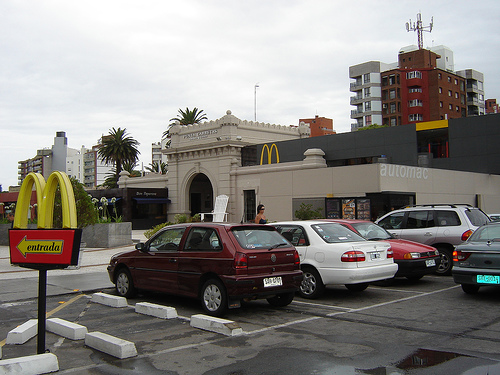
McDonald's restaurant outside

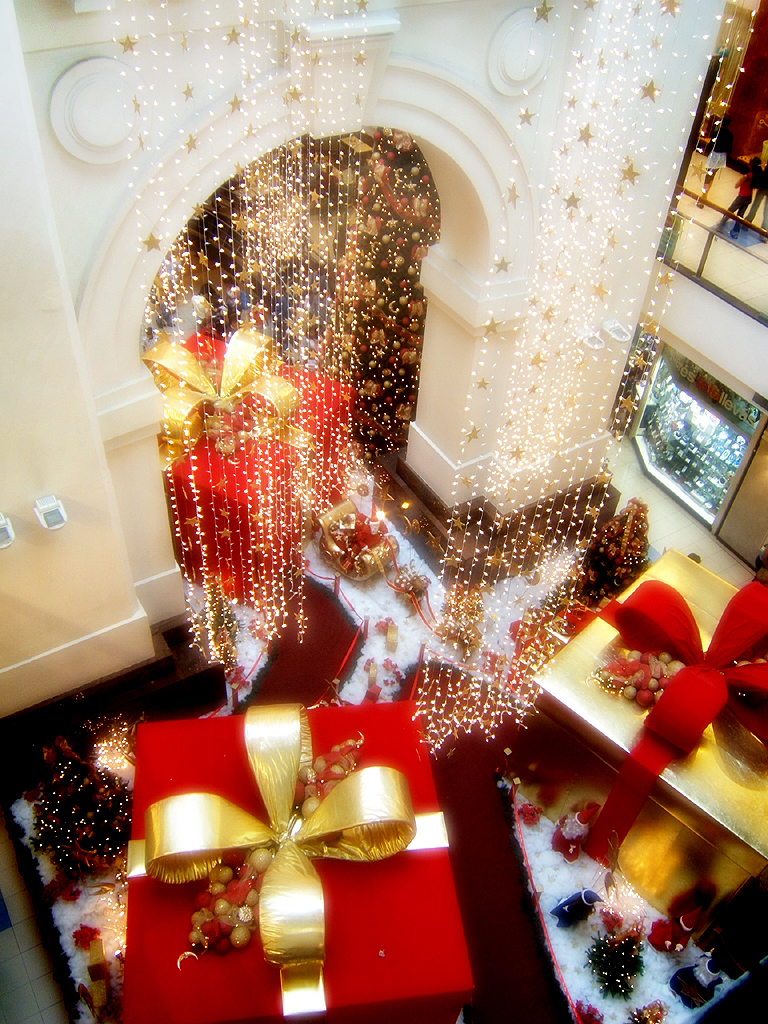
Christmas decoration

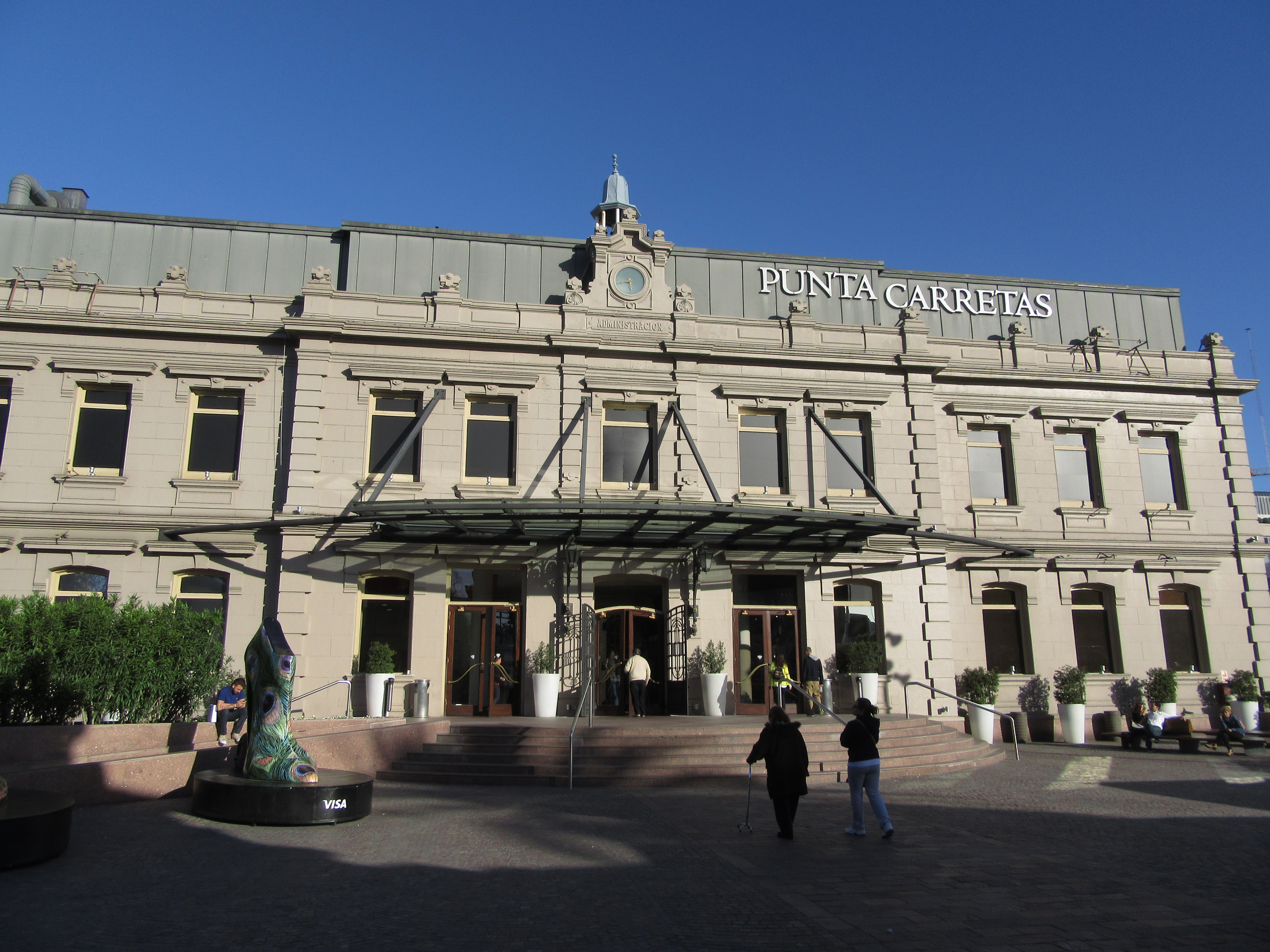
Facade

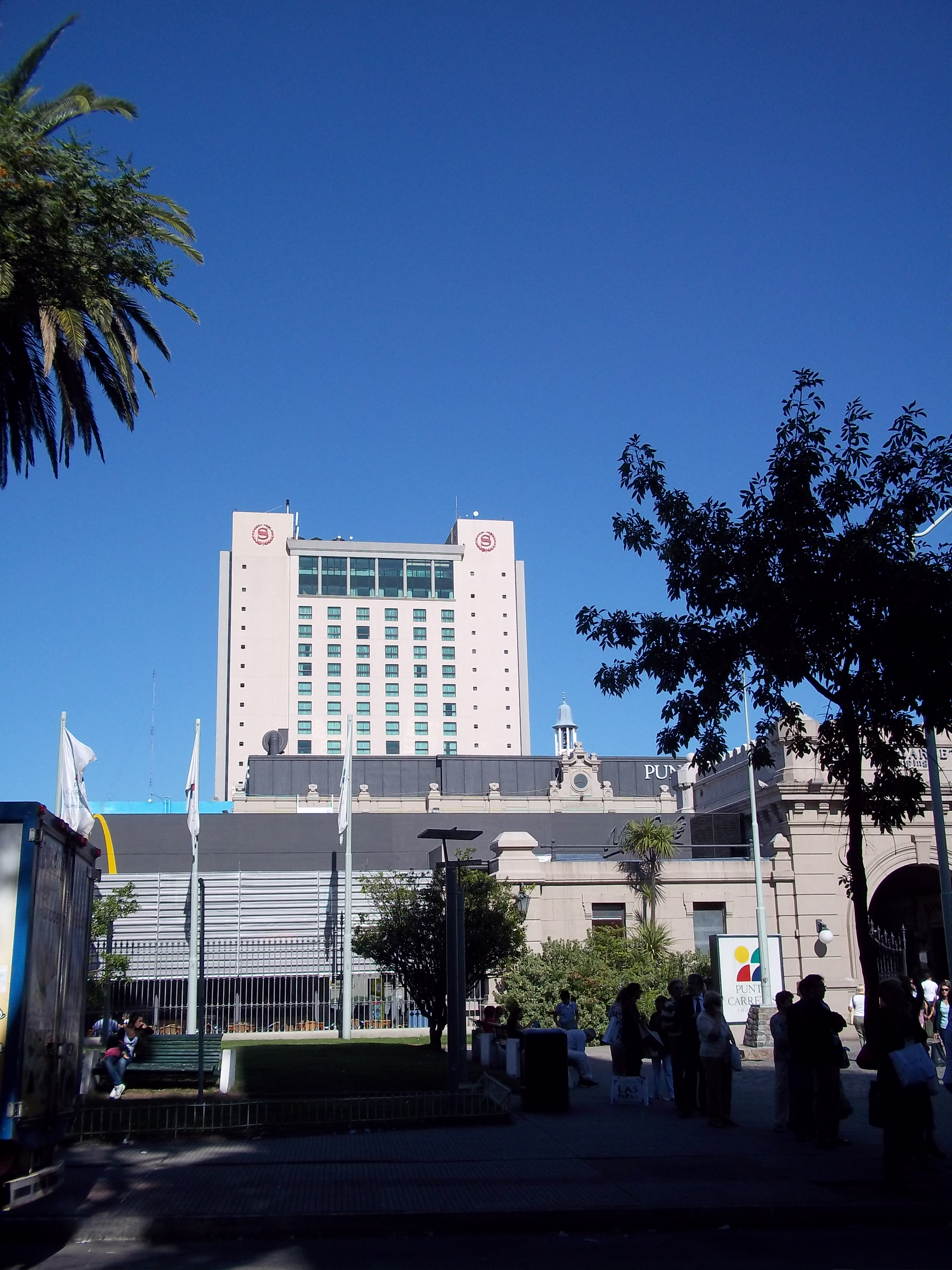
View of the Sheraton Hotel from the entrance of the mall
