= E. J. Lee =

20th-century philatelist

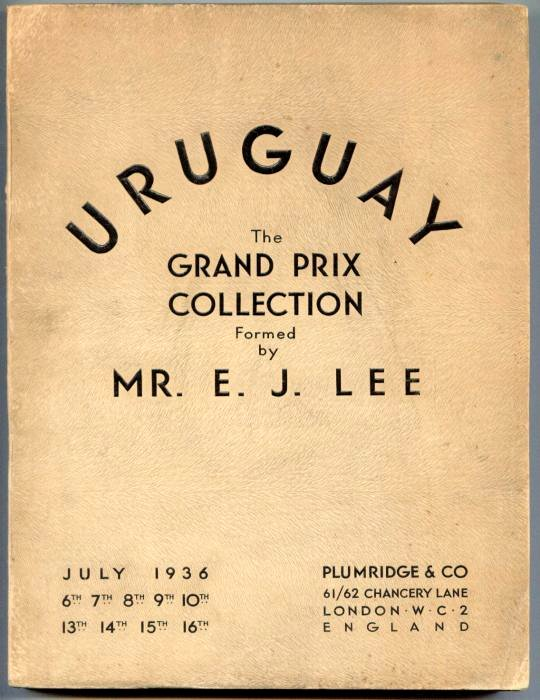
The catalogue for the sale of Lee's Uruguay collection, Plumridge & Co., London, 1936.

Emanuel Joseph Lee (died 1941) was a philatelist who was a specialist in the stamps of Uruguay.

== Philately ==
Lee specialised in the stamps of Uruguay. In 1933, he was awarded the Crawford Medal by the Royal Philatelic Society London for his work The postage stamps of Uruguay. Lee was such an enthusiastic collector of Uruguay that he was once called "the man who killed Uruguay" because during his philatelic career he acquired virtually everything important from Uruguay that came on the market. His Grand-Prix winning Uruguay collection was sold by Plumridge & Co., London, in 1936.

== Selected publications ==
- The postage stamps of Uruguay. London: M. Harvey, 1931.

== See also ==
- Ferrer corner block of 15 of the 80 centésimos green 1856 'Diligencia'
