= Parva Domus =

Micronation in South America

Republic of Parva Domus Magna Quies
- Micronation (unrecognized entity)
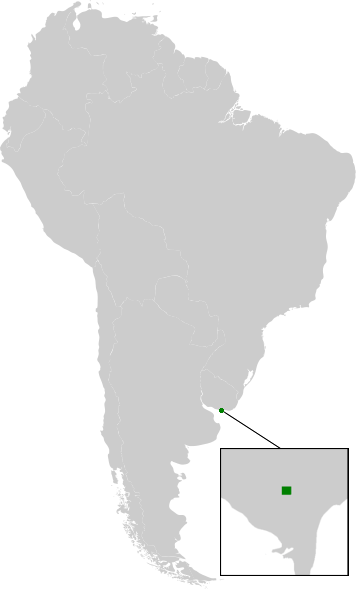

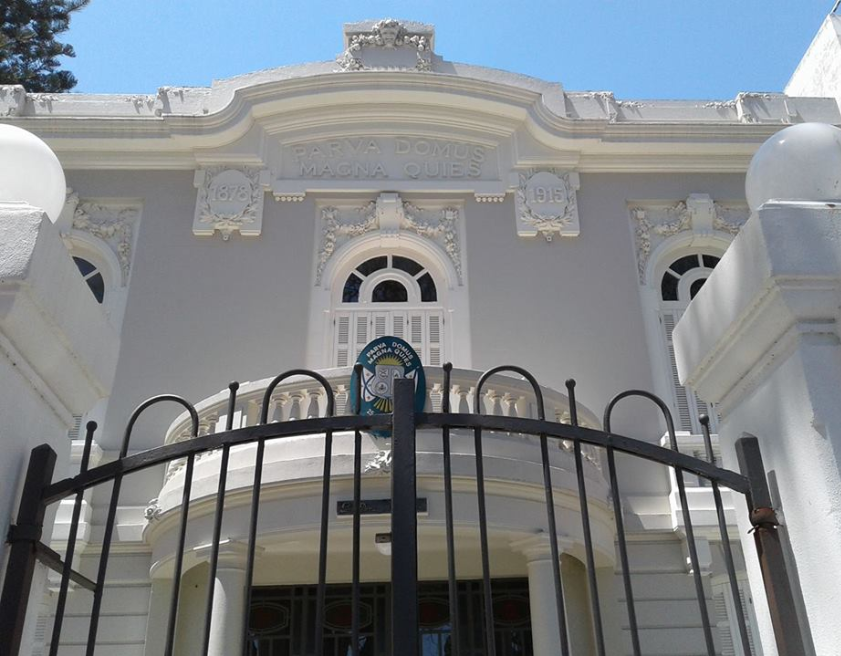
- Area claimed: 0.2 km^{2} (0.077 sq mi)
- Claimed by: Bartolomé Angel Grillo; Milton Marona
- Dates claimed: 25 August 1878–present

Parva Domus, officially the Republic of Parva Domus Magna Quies (Latin for "small house, big rest") is a self-proclaimed micronational republic surrounded by the city of Montevideo, Uruguay. The nation has served as a civil, cultural and recreational association since its foundation in 1878.

== Description ==
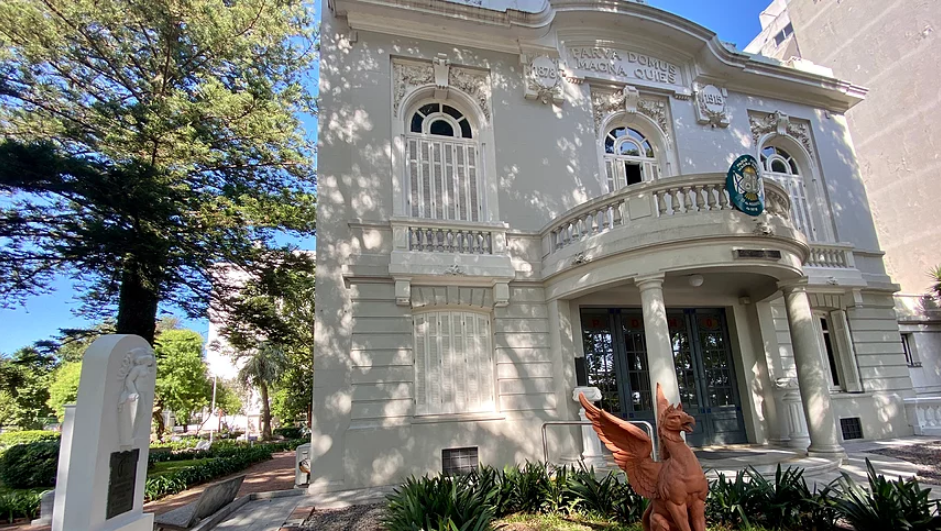
The presidential palace

Parva Domus is a micronation and self-proclaimed republic with a social and recreational aim. Its citizens employ all sorts of flamboyant appellations and honors. The national government is led by a president and a cabinet of ministers. Its territory hosts a neoclassical residence built in 1919, known as the presidential palace. The property is surrounded by gardens and statues. It is located in the neighborhood of Punta Carretas. The constitution of Parva Domus admits a maximum of 250 simultaneous citizens. Only men are allowed to become citizens. In 130 years, the republic has had over 843,297 citizens.

== Famous Parvenses ==
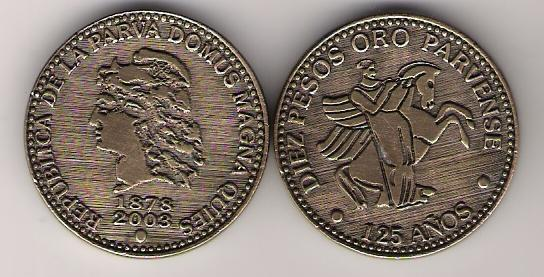
Commemorative coin for the 125th anniversary of independence.

Among its citizens, several stand out: Juan Zorrilla de San Martín, Isidoro de María, Eduardo Rodríguez Larreta and Eduardo Fabini.

== Important events ==
Coat of arms

Flag of Parva Domus.

The Uruguayan Postal Service issued a postage stamp in 2003 in honor of the 125th anniversary of the Republic of Parva Domus. The micronation hosted a meeting between Uruguayan and Argentinean diplomats during the pulp mill dispute in 2007.

Every year during Uruguay's Heritage Day, the nation opens to the public and offers guided visits of its national museum, gardens, and theatre.
