= Isla de Flores Lighthouse =

Lighthouse in Uruguay

Isla de Flores Lighthouse Faro de Isla de Flores
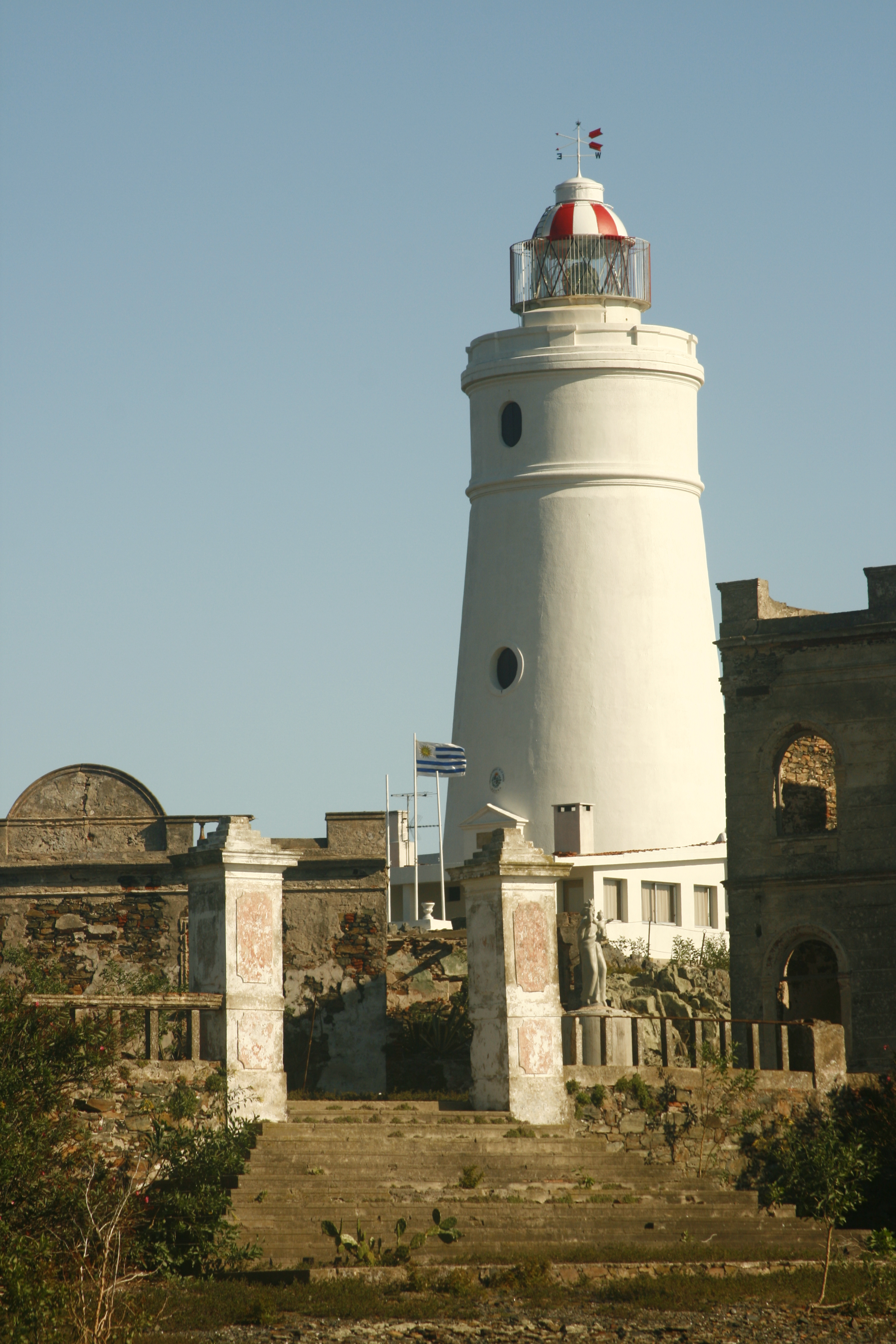
- Isla de Flores lighthouse in 2012.
- Location: Flores Island; Montevideo; Uruguay
- Coordinates: 34°56′45.3″S 55°55′57.7″W

Tower
- Constructed: 1828
- Height: 19.5 metres (64 ft)
- Operator: National Navy of Uruguay

Isla de Flores Lighthouse (Spanish: Faro de Isla de Flores) is a lighthouse located on Flores Island in the Río de la Plata, not far from Montevideo, Uruguay. Erected in 1828, it is one of the most significant historical landmarks in the region. During colonial times it was used as a slave reception station, later as a sanitorium.

The island is placed between the coast of Montevideo and the dangerous "Banco Inglés" shoal. In the 1800s, the Port of Montevideo desperately needed a lighthouse helping with navigation in hazardous waters; so with the Tratado de la Farola it was agreed that Uruguay ceded to Brazil the territory of the Misiones Orientales in exchange for building this structure. For this reason, the Isla de Flores Lighthouse is known as "the most expensive lighthouse in the world".

== See also ==
- List of lighthouses in Uruguay
