= Banco Inglés =

The 'Banco Inglés' (English: English Shoal) is a submarine rocky outcrop crowned by a shoal located in the Río de la Plata estuary. It is a rocky peak or ancient submerged granite islet that forms a natural barrier to the waters of the Atlantic Ocean, on which the alluvial silt carried by the Río de la Plata is deposited; this makes the silt a true semi-submerged island. It is located 10 nautical miles south of Flores Island.

== Overview ==
It was the most feared navigational hazard on the Río de la Plata, which is why it was the first to appear on charts. The Banco Inglés appears in the accounts of the first European expeditions to reach the Río de Plata, such as Juan Díaz de Solís, Ferdinand Magellan, Sebastian Cabot and Hernando de Ribera, and was known as Bajo de los Castellanos (Castellanos Shoal). This landform was named after John Drake, nephew of Francis Drake, who was shipwrecked in February 1583 near Punta del Este. When captured by the Spanish, he claimed to be a survivor of a merchant ship sunk in the Castellanos Shoal in order to conceal his status as a pirate. From then on, it began to be called the English Shoal.

Uruguayan sailor Francisco Miranda set the coordinates of its northern tip at 35°07′S 55°55′W, while those of the tip of its sandbar were set at 35°21′S 56°06′W.

Several lighthouses help navigating this dangerous feature: Punta Brava Lighthouse, Isla de Flores lighthouse, etc.

According to the Río de la Plata Treaty, the Banco Inglés is located in waters shared by Argentina and Uruguay, but the exploration and exploitation of its seabed and subsoil resources belong to Uruguay.

== Bibliography ==
- Miguel Lobo, Alcide Boucarut, Pedro Riudavets y Tudury (1868). Manual de la navegación del Rio de la Plata y de sus principales afluentes: con instrucciones para la recalada y derrotas de ida y vuelta á Europa, según los documentos más fidedignos, nacionales y extranjeros (in Spanish). Estab. tip. de T. Fortanet. pp. 167–170.
