= Punta Brava Lighthouse =

Punta Brava Lighthouse Punta Carretas
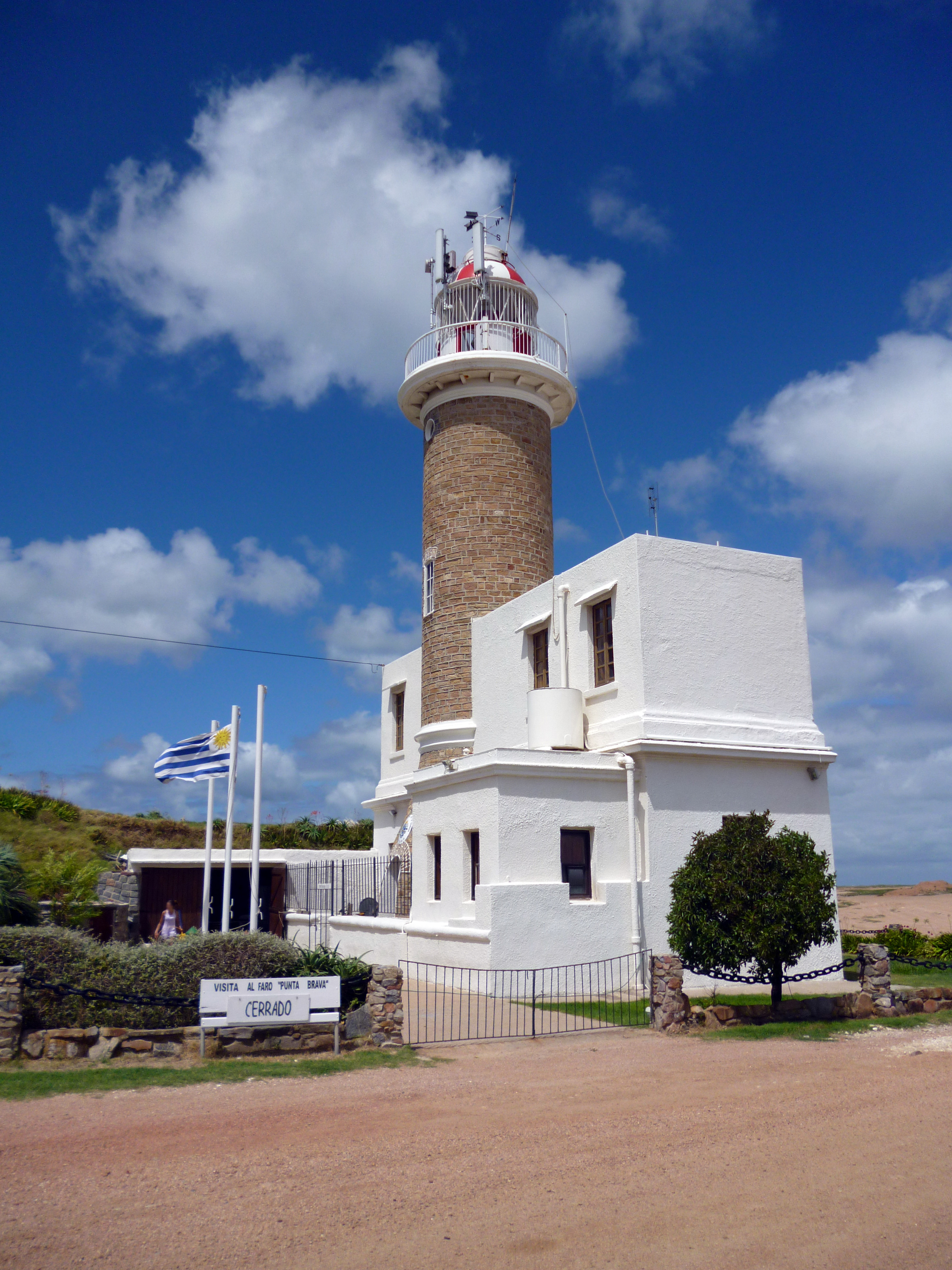
- Punta Brava Lighthouse
- Location: Punta Brava; Montevideo; Uruguay
- Coordinates: 34.935311°S 56.160579°W

Tower
- Constructed: 1876
- Construction: brick tower
- Automated: 1962
- Height: 19 metres (62 ft)
- Shape: cylindrical tower with balcony and lantern atop keeper’s house
- Markings: unpainted tower, white lantern with red vertical stripes
- Power source: mains electricity

Light
- Focal height: 21 metres (69 ft)
- Range: 15 nmi (28 km)
- Characteristic: Fl WR 5s.
- Uruguay no.: UY-151

Punta Brava Lighthouse (Spanish: Faro de Punta Brava), also known as Punta Carretas Lighthouse, is a lighthouse in Punta Carretas, Montevideo, Uruguay. It was erected in 1876. The lighthouse has a height of 21 metres and its light reaches 15 nautical miles (28 kilometres) away, with a flash every ten seconds. In 1962, the lighthouse became electric. The lighthouse is important for guiding boats into the Banco Inglés, Buceo Port or the entrance of the Santa Lucía River, west of Montevideo city.

== See also ==
- List of lighthouses in Uruguay
