= Ounce =

Unit of mass

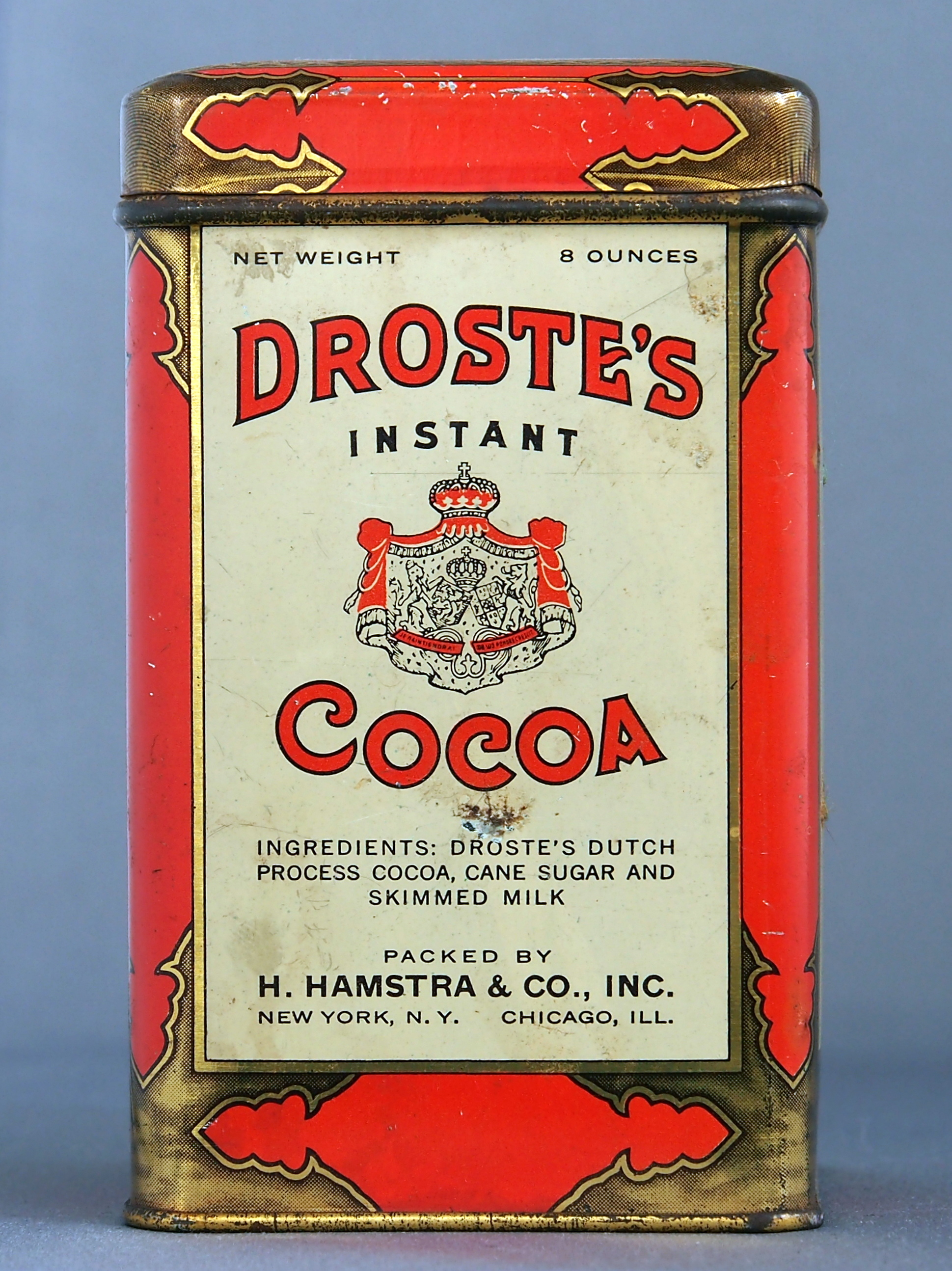
- Droste's Instant Cocoa with a net weight of 8 ounces

General information
- Unit system: Imperial system, US customary
- Unit of: Mass, weight, volume
- Symbol: ℥, oz

The ounce (/ˈaʊns/) is any of several different units of mass, weight, or volume and is derived almost unchanged from the uncia, an Ancient Roman unit of measurement.

The avoirdupois ounce (exactly 28.349523125 g) is 1/16 avoirdupois pound; this is the United States customary and British imperial ounce. It is primarily used in the United States.

Although the avoirdupois ounce is the mass measure used for most purposes, the 'troy ounce' of exactly 31.1034768 g is used instead for the mass of precious metals such as gold, silver, platinum, palladium, rhodium, etc.

The term 'ounce' is also used in other contexts:

- The ounce-force is a measure of force (see below).
- The fluid ounce is a measure of volume.

Historically, a variety of different ounces measuring mass or volume were used in different jurisdictions by different trades and at different times in history.

== Etymology ==
Ounce derives from the Ancient Roman uncia (meaning: a twelfth), a unit in the Ancient Roman units of measurement weighing about 27.4 grams or 96.7% of an avoirdupois ounce, that was one-twelfth (1/12) of the Roman pound (libra). This in turn comes from Latin unus ('one'), and thus originally meant simply 'unit'. The term uncia was borrowed twice: first into Pre–Old English, becoming ynce in Old English, which survives in modern English as inch; and a second time into Middle English through Anglo-Norman and Middle French (unce, once, ounce), yielding English ounce. The abbreviation oz came later from the Italian cognate onza, pronounced [ˈontsa] (or later oncia, pronounced [ˈontʃa]).

== Definitions ==
Historically, in different parts of the world, at different points in time, and for different applications, the ounce (or its translation) has referred to broadly similar but still slightly different standards of mass.

Mass of ounce units
Variant	(grams)	(grains)
International avoirdupois ounce	28.349523125	437.5
International troy ounce	31.1034768	480
Apothecaries' ounce	31.1034768	480
Maria Theresa ounce	28.0668	433.137
Spanish ounce (onza)	28.75	
French ounce (once)	30.59	
Portuguese ounce (onça)	28.69	
Roman/Italian ounce (oncia)	27.4	
Dutch metric ounce (ons)	100	
Dutch (pre-metric) ounce (ons)	ca. 30	
Chinese metric ounce (盎司)	50	
English Tower ounce	29.16	450

=== Active use ===
==== International avoirdupois ounce ====
The international avoirdupois ounce (abbreviated oz) is defined as exactly 28.349523125 g under the international yard and pound agreement of 1959, signed by the United States and countries of the Commonwealth of Nations.

In the avoirdupois system, sixteen ounces make up an avoirdupois pound, and the avoirdupois pound is defined as 7000 grains; one avoirdupois ounce is therefore equal to 437.5 grains.

The ounce is still a standard unit in the United States. In the United Kingdom it ceased to be an independent unit of measure in 2000, but may still be seen as a general indicator of portion sizes in burger and steak restaurants.

==== International troy ounce ====
A troy ounce (abbreviated oz t) is equal to 480 grains. Consequently, the international troy ounce is equal to exactly 31.1034768 grams. There are 12 troy ounces in the obsolete troy pound.

The troy ounce is used only to express the mass of precious metals such as gold, platinum, palladium, rhodium or silver. Bullion coins are the most common products marketed in troy ounces, but precious metal bars also exist in gram and kilogram (kg) sizes. (A kilogram bullion bar contains 32.151 troy ounces.)

For historical measurement of gold,

- a fine ounce is a troy ounce of pure gold content in a gold bar, computed as fineness multiplied by gross weight
- a standard ounce is a troy ounce of 22 carat gold, 91.66% pure (an 11 to 1 proportion of gold to alloy material)

==== Metric ounces ====
Some countries have redefined their ounces in the metric system. For example, the German apothecaries' ounce of 30 grams is very close to the previously widespread Nuremberg ounce, but the divisions and multiples come out in metric.

In 1820, the Dutch redefined their ounce (in Dutch, ons) as 100 grams. In 1937 the IJkwet of the Netherlands officially abolished the term, but it is still commonly used. Dutch amendments to the metric system, such as an ons or 100 grams, has been inherited, adopted, and taught in Indonesia beginning in elementary school. It is also listed as standard usage in Indonesia's national dictionary, the Kamus Besar Bahasa Indonesia, and the government's official elementary-school curriculum.

=== Historical ===
==== Apothecaries' ounce ====
The apothecaries' ounce (abbreviated ℥) equivalent to the troy ounce, was formerly used by apothecaries, and is thus obsolete. It has a Unicode codepoint, U+2125 ℥ OUNCE SIGN.

==== Maria Theresa ounce ====
"Maria Theresa ounce" was once introduced in Ethiopia and some European countries, which was equal to the weight of one Maria Theresa thaler, or 28.0668 g. Both the weight and the value are the definition of one birr, still in use in present-day Ethiopia and formerly in Eritrea.

==== Spanish ounce ====
The Spanish pound (Spanish: libra) was 460 g. The Spanish ounce (Spanish onza) was 1/16 of a pound, i.e. 28.75 g. It was further subdivided into 16 adarmes (each 1.8 grams). For pharmaceutical use, the Greek dracma was used, subdividing the Spanish ounce into 8 (3.6 grams), due to being equivalent to 1/12 of an avoirdupois ounce. In either case, it could be further subdivided into grains, each one 49.9 milligrams.

==== Tower ounce ====
The Tower ounce of 450 grains (29 grams) was a fraction of the tower pound used in the English mints, the principal one being in the Tower of London. It dates back to the Anglo-Saxon coinage weight standard. It was abolished in favour of the Troy ounce by Henry VIII in 1527.

== Ounce-force ==
An ounce-force is 1/16 of a pound-force, or about 0.2780139 newtons. It is defined as the force exerted by a mass of one avoirdupois ounce under standard gravity (at sea level, its weight).

The "ounce" in "ounce-force" is equivalent to an avoirdupois ounce; ounce-force is a measurement of force using avoirdupois ounces. It is customarily not identified or differentiated. The term has limited use in engineering calculations to simplify unit conversions between mass, force, and acceleration systems of calculations.

== Fluid ounce ==
A fluid ounce (abbreviated fl oz, fl. oz. or oz. fl.) is a unit of volume. An imperial fluid ounce is defined in British law as exactly 28.4130625 millilitres, while a US customary fluid ounce is exactly 29.5735295625 mL, and a US food labelling fluid ounce is 30 mL. The fluid ounce is sometimes referred to simply as an "ounce" in contexts where its use is implicit, such as bartending.

== Other uses ==
=== Fabric weight ===
Ounces are also used to express the "weight", or more accurately the areal density, of a textile fabric in North America, Asia, or the UK, as in "16 oz denim". The number refers to the weight in ounces of a given amount of fabric, either a yard of a given width, or a square yard, where the depth of the fabric is a fabric-specific constant.

Fabric type	Typical weight in ounces
Organza, voile, chiffon	1–3
Most cottons, wools, silks, muslin, linen	4–7
Denim, corduroy, twill, velvet	7–16

=== Copper layer thickness of a printed circuit board ===
The most common unit of measure for the copper thickness on a printed circuit board (PCB) is ounces (oz), as in mass. It is the resulting thickness when the mass of copper is pressed flat and spread evenly over a one-square-foot area. 1 oz will roughly equal 34.7 μm.
