= Ferrer block =

Corner block of 15 of 80 centésimos green 1856 Diligencia stamps

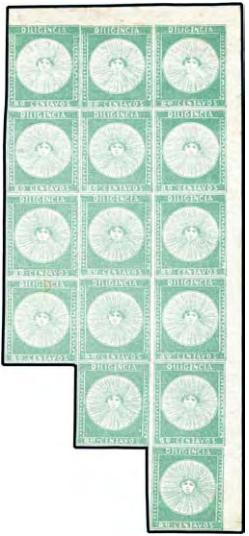
- 1856 Diligencia multiple, 'Ferrer block'.
- Country of production: Uruguay
- Location of production: Montevideo
- Date of production: 1 October 1856
- Nature of rarity: Largest known multiple
- No. in existence: Unique
- Face value: 15x 80 centésimos
- Estimated value: between US$ 500,000 and US$ 600,000

The Ferrer block is a corner block of 15 of the 80 centésimos green 1856 'Diligencia' (Suns) postage stamps, and is regarded by many philatelists as the most important item of Uruguayan philately. Fred Melville, speaking philatelically, called it "one of the seven wonders of the world". It is the largest known multiple of this issue of which only a few blocks are known to exist. Most of the plating information about this issue has been derived from this one block.

== The 'Diligencia' stamps ==
The postal services in Uruguay organised by the stagecoach companies, issued on October 1, 1856, the so-called 'Diligencia' (stagecoach stamp). This issue was intended for correspondence carried by stagecoach. There were three values:

- 60 centésimos blue, for single page letters
- 80 centésimos green, for two-page letters
- 1 real red, for three-page letters.

The stamps were issued in sheets of 35, printed on white woven unwatermarked paper at the Mège Lithograph Workshop of Mège y Willems Printing Ltd in Montevideo.

== Largest known multiple ==
The 80 centésimos green corner block of 15 is a multiple from the top right of an unused sheet of 35. It includes positions 3–5, 8-10, 13–15, 18–20, 24-25 and 30. Plating of the 'Diligencias' was made possible by the slightly shifted alignment of transfers and the common characteristics of this sheet.

This multiple originates from a complete sheet originally owned by Dr. Wonner. The ‘Soto Hermanos’ philatelic dealers broke it up into several blocks in the 19th Century. Subsequently, it was part of the collection of Vicente Ferrer (who named it), Wonner, Charles Lathrop Pack, E.J. Lee, Alfred Lichtenstein, Roberto Hoffmann, Norman Hubbard, Gene Scott and Tito Giamporcaro.

== Significance ==
The block enabled Pack to establish new concepts on the plating of this issue, which were improved by E.J. Lee. Most plating of this issue has been derived from this block and it is considered the foundation upon which the technical philately of Uruguay is built.

In September 2009 it sold at Investphila in Switzerland for €432,000 including fees (lot nr. 674, starting at €300,000).

== See also ==
- List of notable postage stamps
- Postage stamps and postal history of Uruguay
