= Nuestra Señora del Sagrado Corazón, Montevideo =

Roman Catholic parish church in Montevideo, Uruguay

Coordinates: 34°55′22.4″S 56°9′31.2″W

Iglesia de Nuestra Señora del Sagrado Corazón
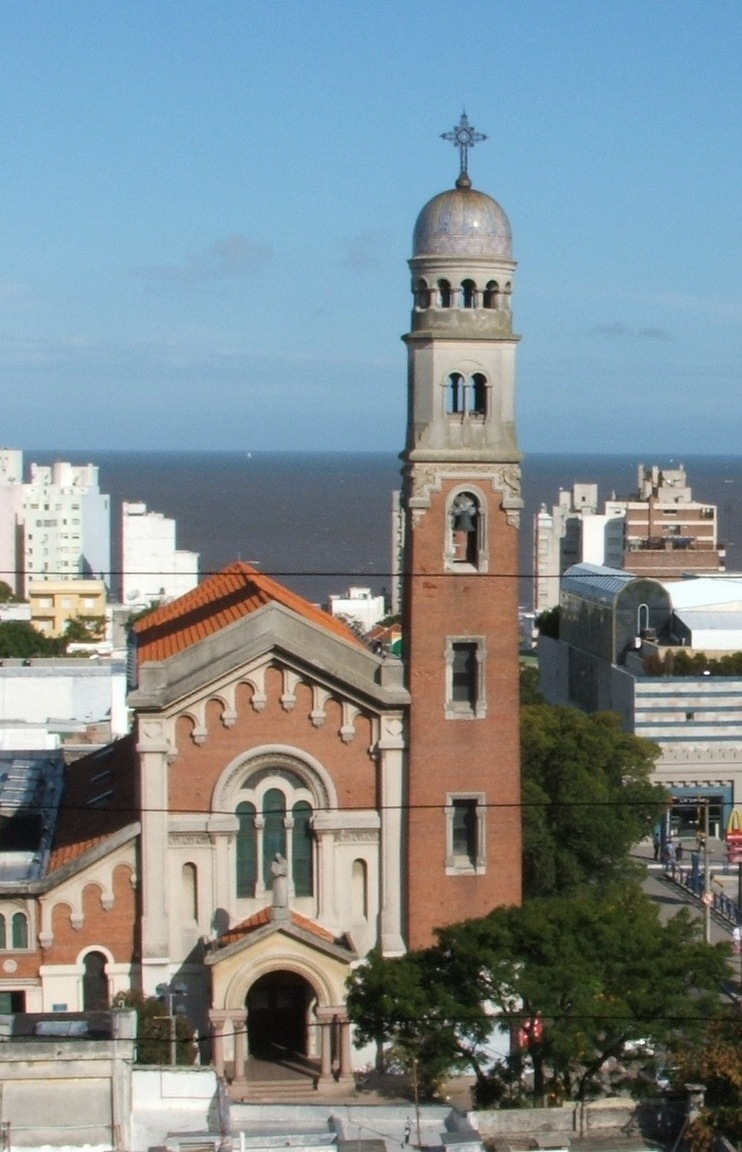

Religion
- Affiliation: Roman Catholic
- Ecclesiastical or organizational status: Parish church
- Year consecrated: 30 October 1919

Location
- Location: José Ellauri 408; Montevideo, Uruguay
- Interactive map of Iglesia de Nuestra Señora del Sagrado Corazón

Architecture
- Architect: Elzeario Boix
- Type: Church
- Style: Neo-Romanesque
- Completed: 1927

The Church of Our Lady of the Sacred Heart (Spanish: Iglesia de Nuestra Señora del Sagrado Corazón), popularly known as Iglesia Punta Carretas (due to its location in the neighbourhood of Punta Carretas) is a Roman Catholic parish church in Montevideo, Uruguay.

The parish was established 30 October 1919. The temple was built between 1917 and 1927 and originally held by the Friars Minor Capuchin. Since 1983 it is run by the secular clergy.

The temple is dedicated to Our Lady of the Sacred Heart. A small side chapel for daily masses is devoted to St. Marcellin Champagnat.
