= Correo Uruguayo =

National postal service of Uruguay

National Postal Administration
- Administración Nacional de Correos

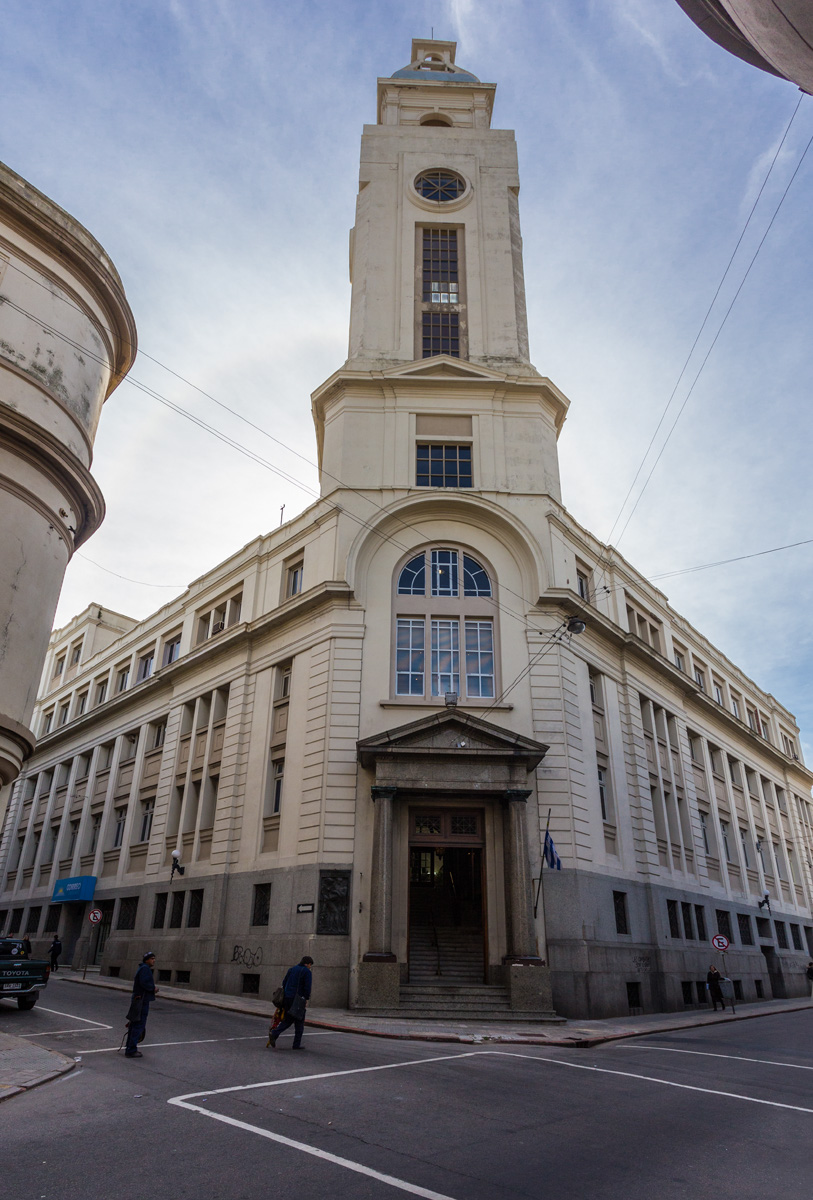

Agency overview
- Formed: December 21, 1827; 198 years ago
- Jurisdiction: Government of Uruguay
- Headquarters: Misiones 1310-1346, 11000 Montevideo, Montevideo Department, Uruguay; 34.908491°S 56.205435°W
- Website: correo.com.uy

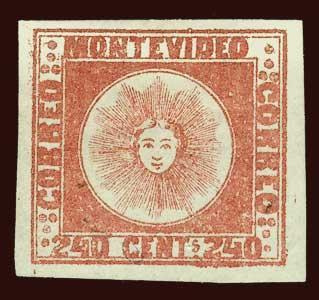
An 1858 Uruguayan stamp

The National Postal Administration (Spanish: Administración Nacional de Correos), trading as Correo Uruguayo (lit. 'Uruguayan Mail') is the state-owned national postal service of Uruguay.

== Headquarters ==
The headquarters of Correo Uruguayo is the Palacio de Correos de Montevideo, located in the Ciudad Vieja neighborhood. The reinforced concrete building was inaugurated in 1925 and has a 63-meter tower. The Museo Postal operates in the same complex, which has an extensive collection on the history of the country's postal service.

== See also ==
- Postage stamps and postal history of Uruguay
- Universal Postal Union
- Postal Union of the Americas, Spain and Portugal
