= Punta Carretas =

- Barrio
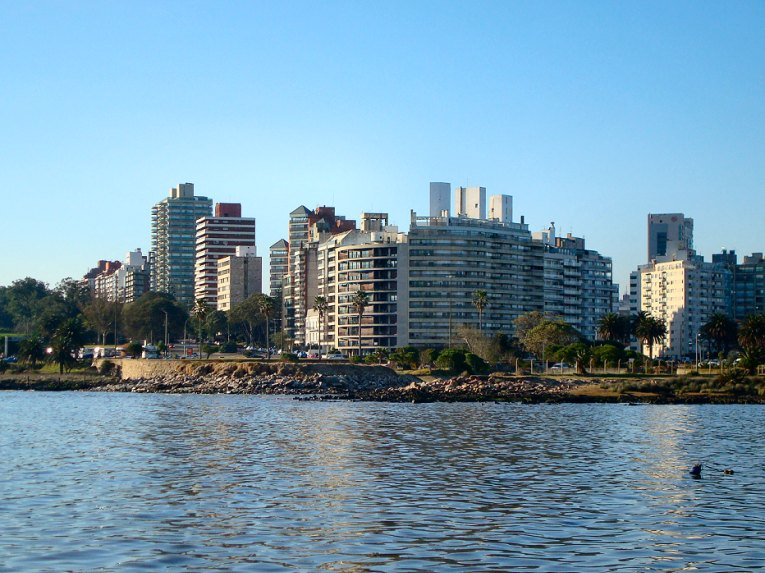
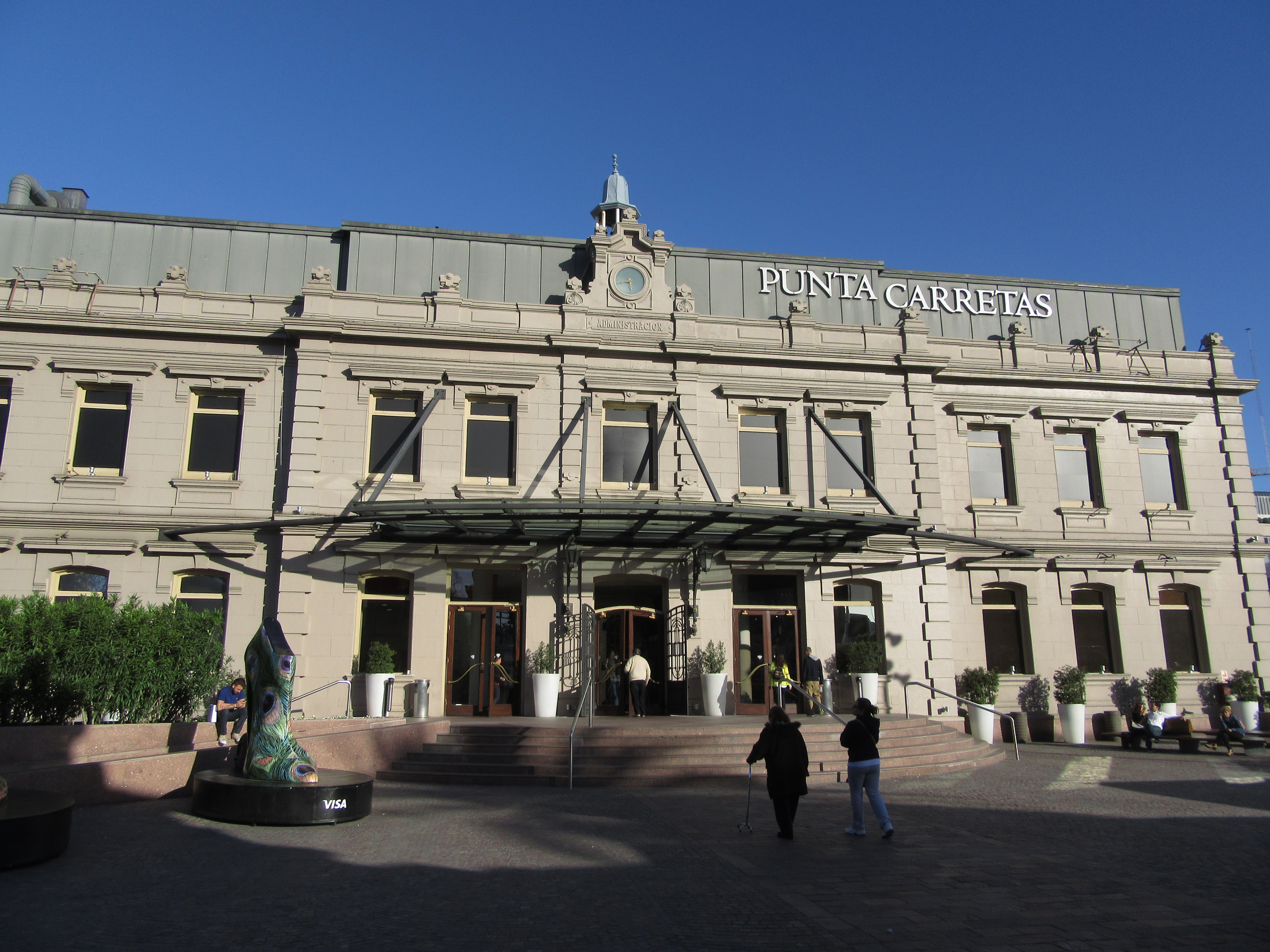
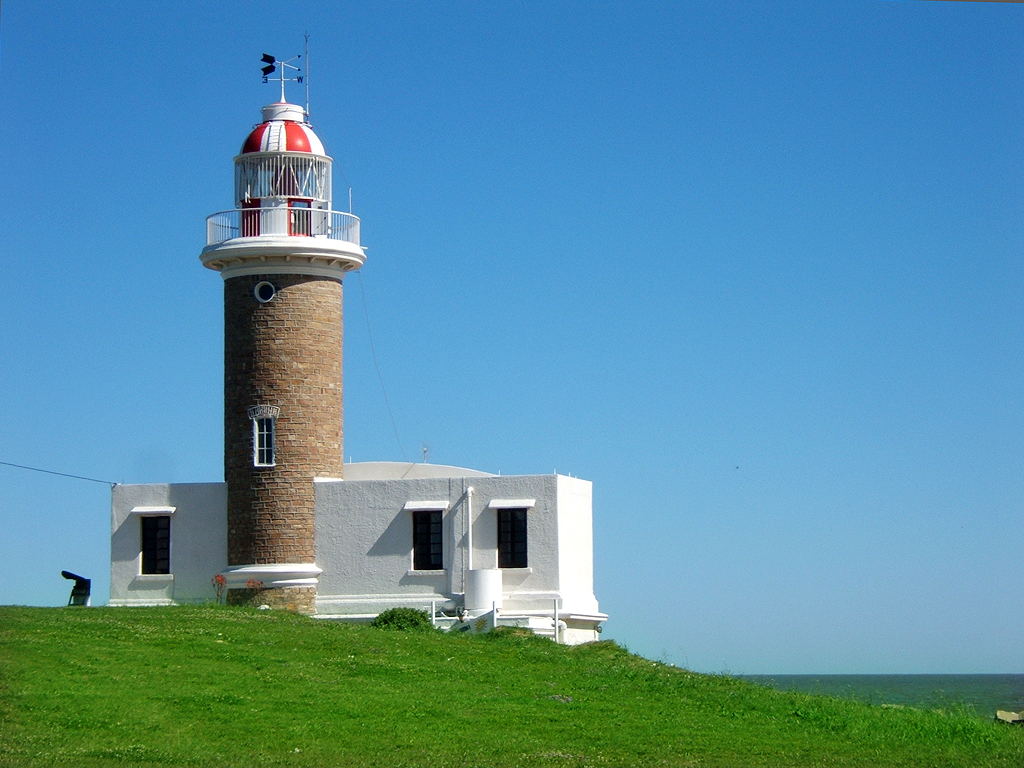
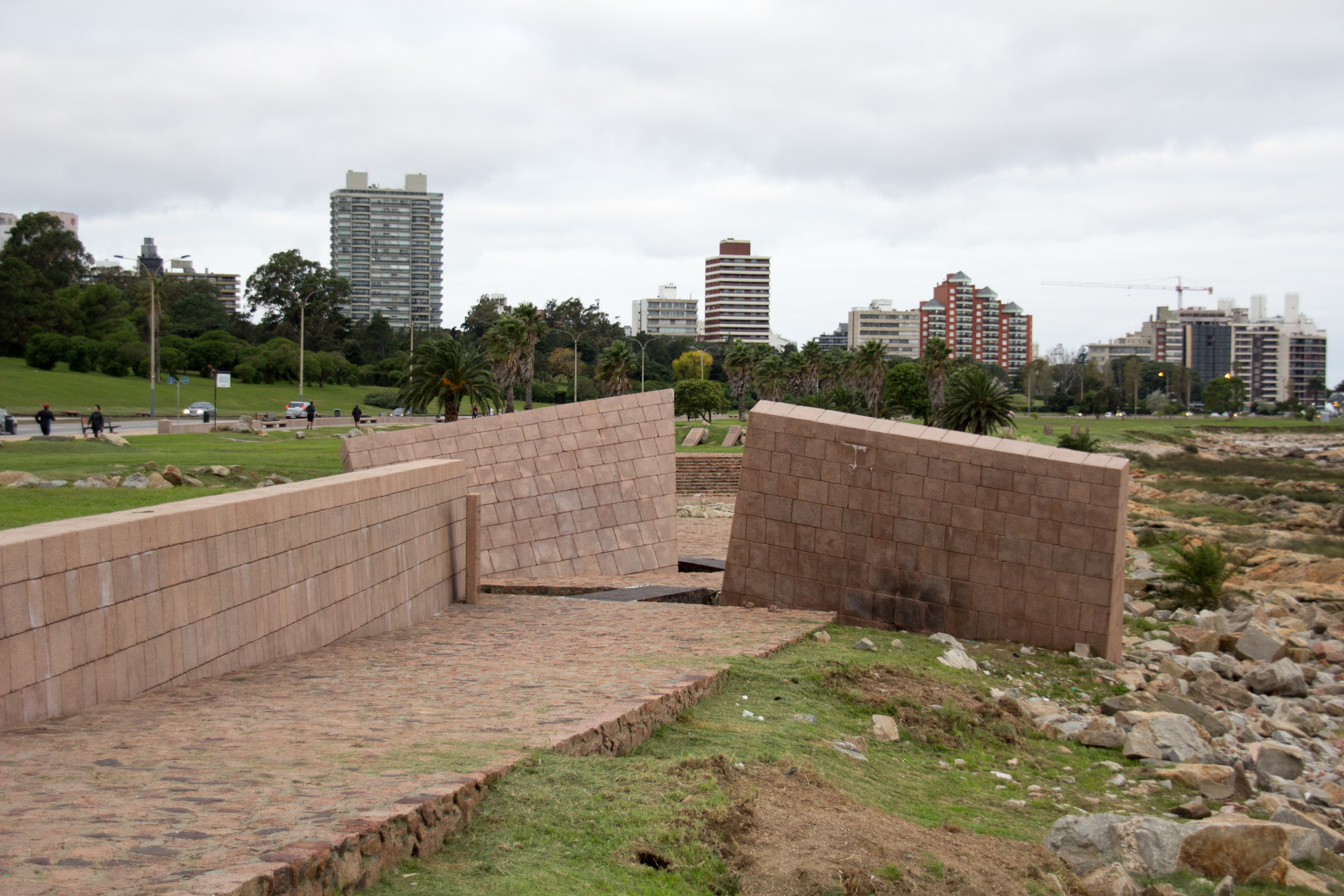
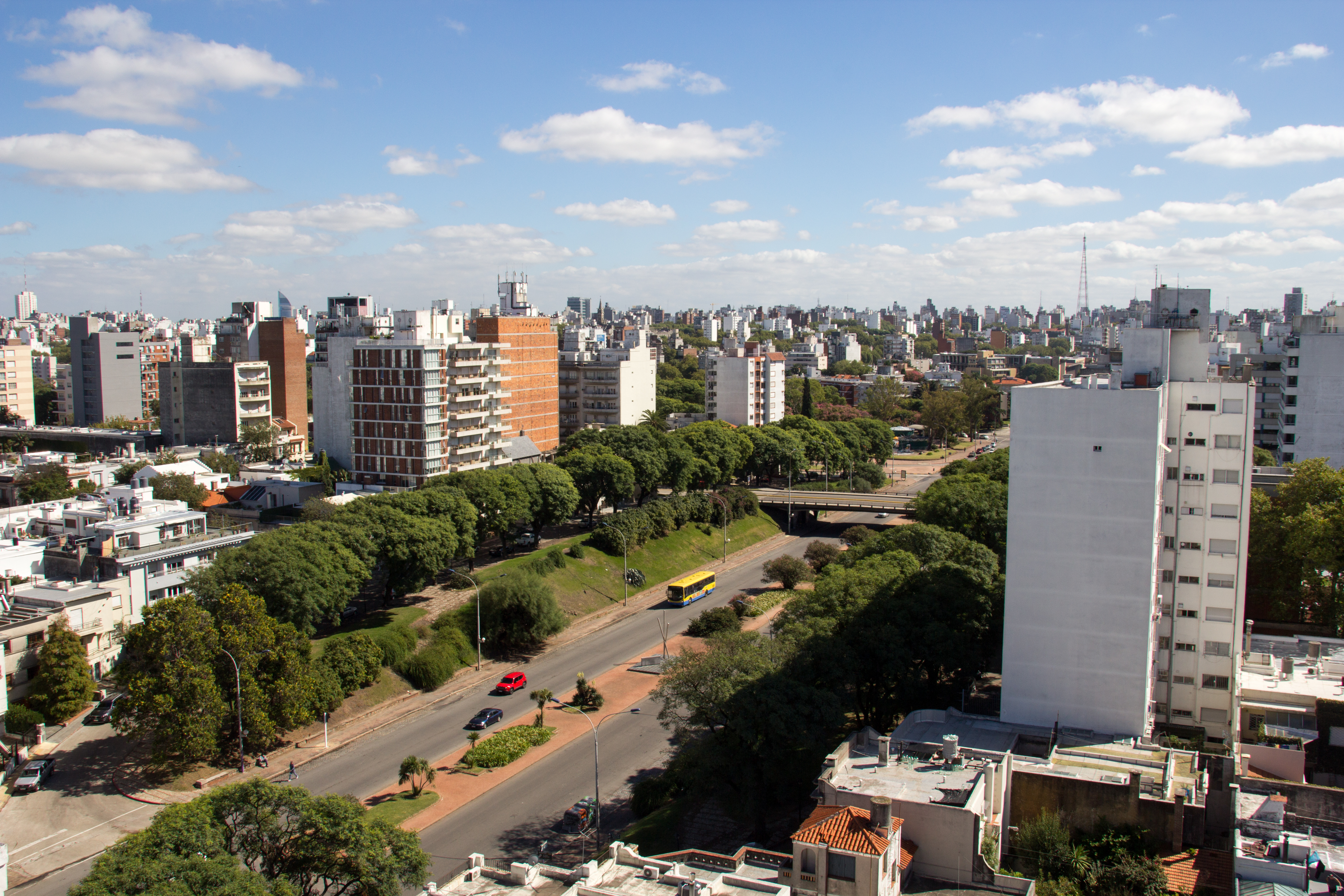
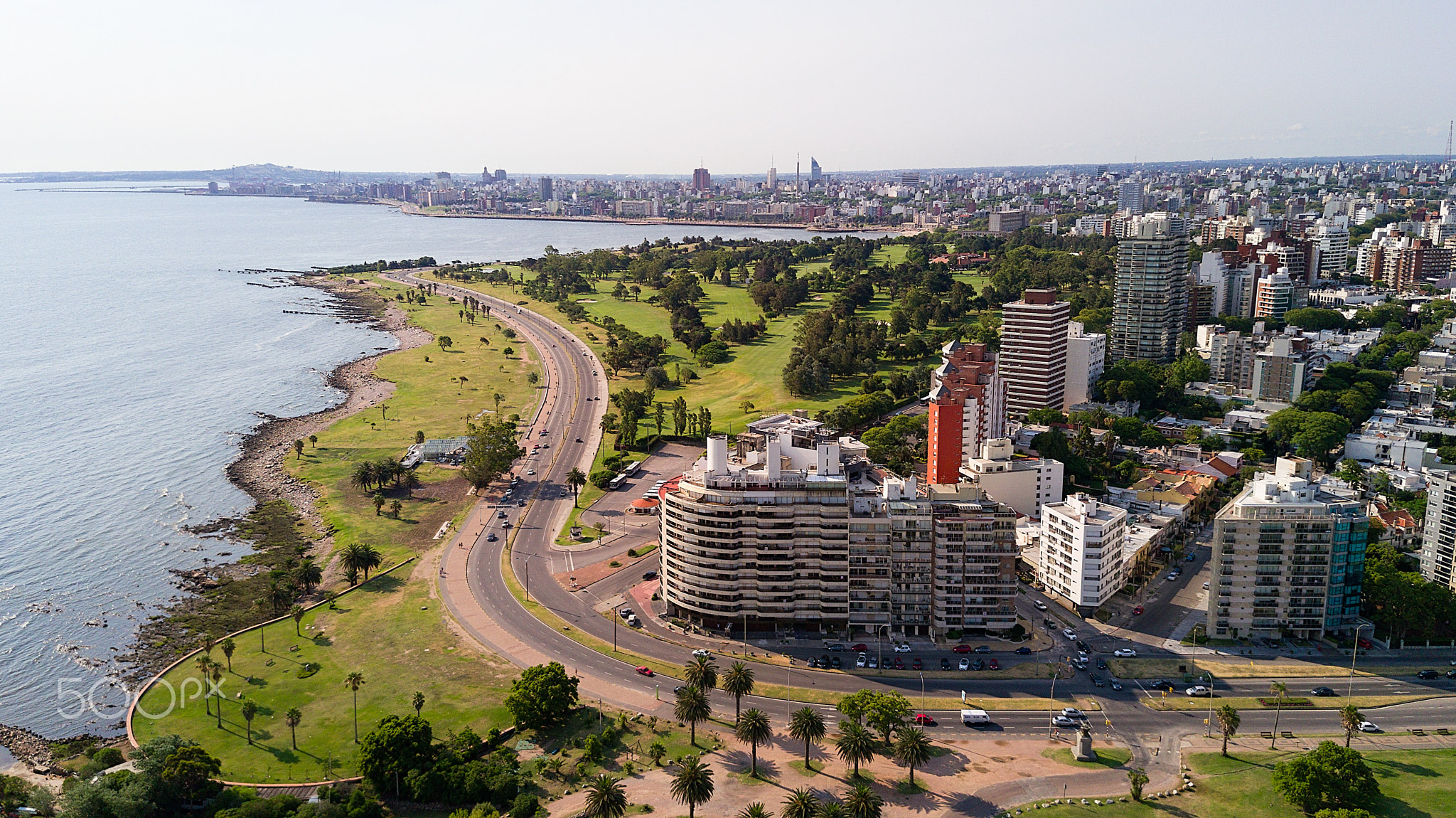
- Skyline of Punta Carretas from the Río de la Plata Punta Carretas Shopping Punta Brava Lighthouse Holocaust Memorial Artigas Boulevard Club de Golf del Uruguay

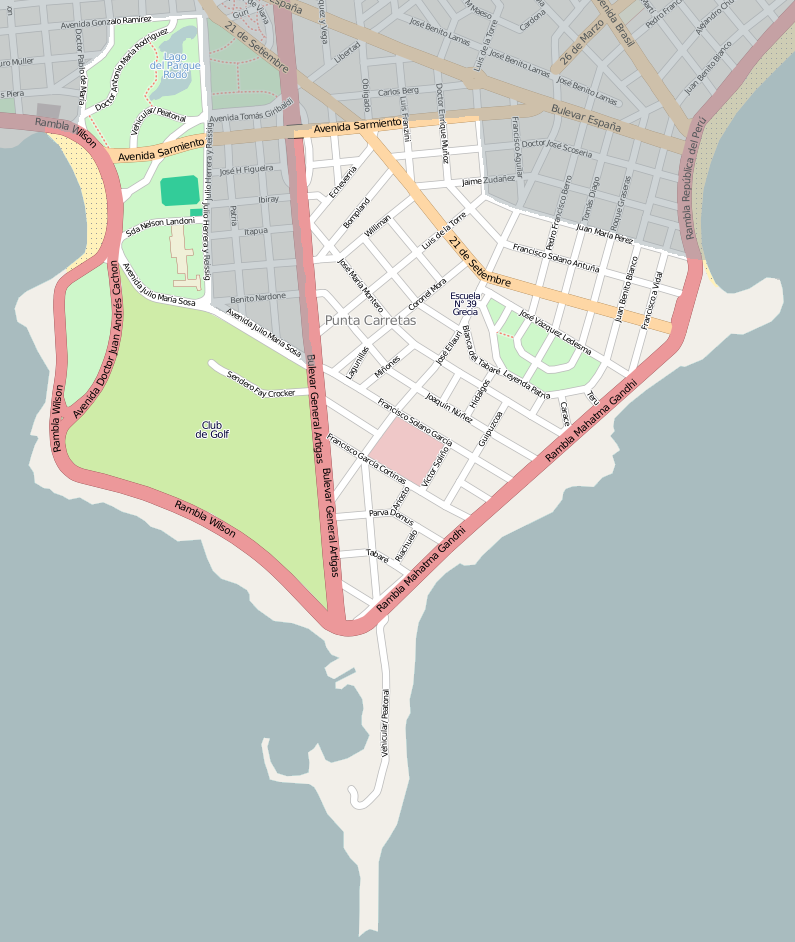
- Street map of Punta Carretas

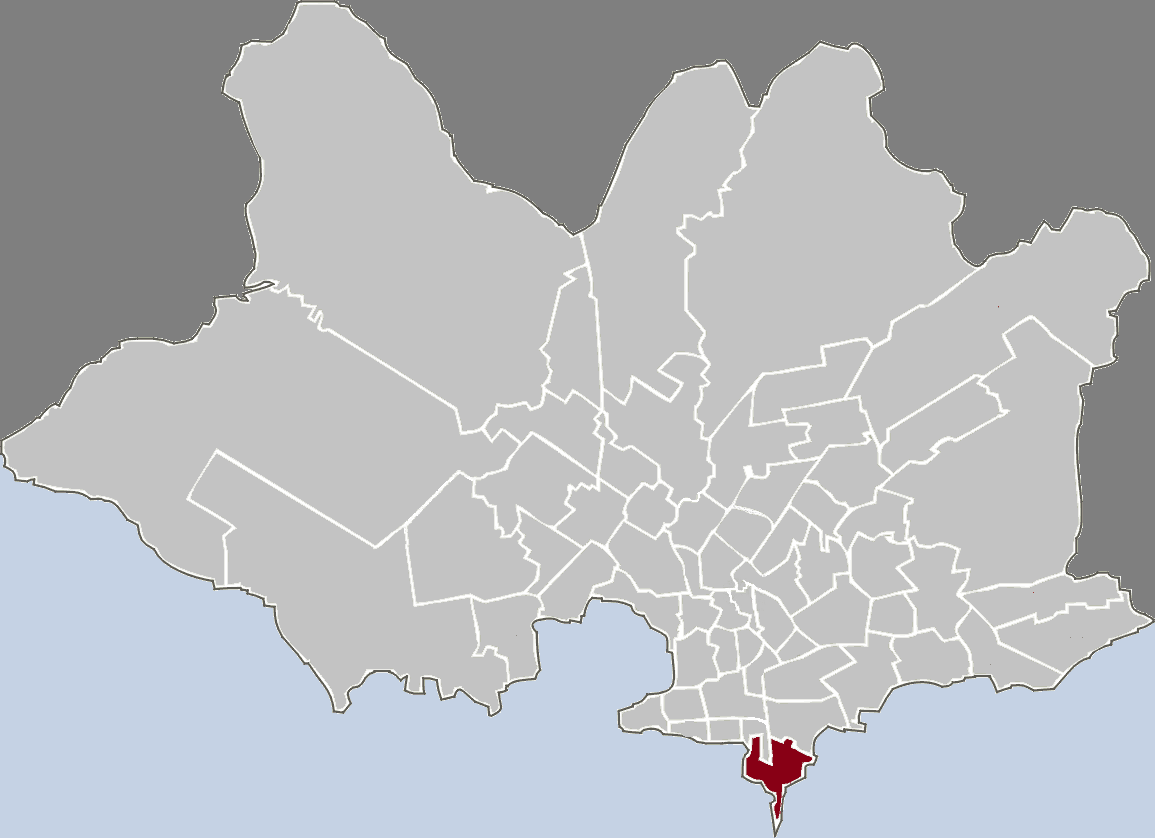
- Location of Punta Carretas in Montevideo
- Coordinates: 34°55′42″S 56°9′36″W
- Country: Uruguay
- Department: Montevideo Department
- City: Montevideo

Punta Carretas is a barrio (neighbourhood or district) of Montevideo, Uruguay.

Politically located in the Municipality CH, it is an affluent neighborhood, with a high population density and a large number of high-rise apartment buildings. It is also an area with a large presence of exclusive private schools, international stores, haute cuisine restaurants and embassies.

== Geography ==
Punta Carretas borders Parque Rodó to the north and west, Pocitos to the east and northeast, and the coastline to the south. It is the southernmost neighborhood of the city.

The area is bounded by Artigas Boulevard, the Rambla to the south and west, Sarmiento Avenue to the north, and Calle Juan María Pérez to the east and northeast. Its main roads are José Ellauri and 21 de Septiembre avenues.

== History ==
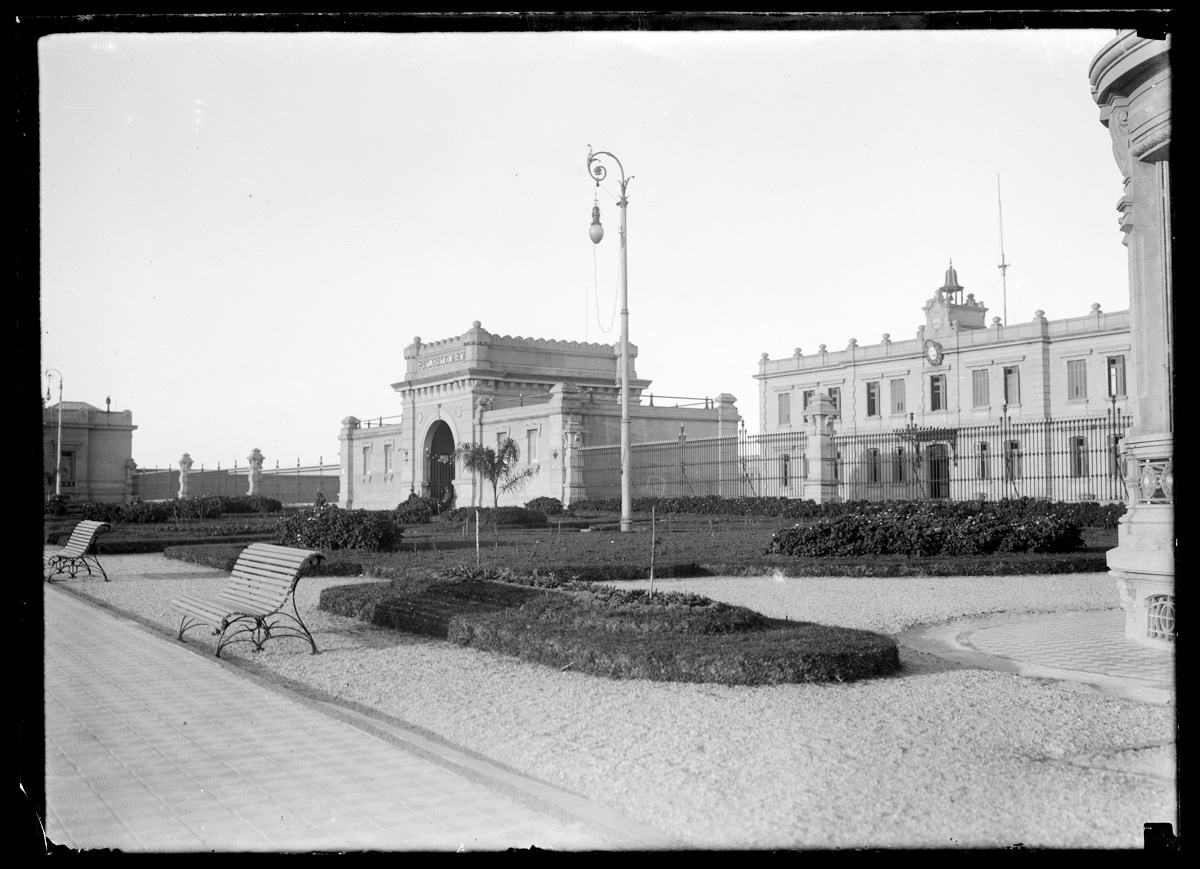
Punta Carretas Prison in 1918

The area that the neighborhood currently occupies was named Punta Brava by sailors, due to a rock that stretches out underwater and caused several shipwrecks. Later, it was called Punta Carretas, due to the shape of said rock, which resembled a cart (Spanish: Carreta).

In the 1870s, the 21-meter Punta Brava Lighthouse was built, which during its early years was known as "La Farola". From August 1948 it worked on electricity.

Between 1880 and 1890 there was a hippodrome in the central area of the neighborhood, with a high-rise box with capacity for 1,500 people.

In 1915, a 400-cell prison was inaugurated to house common and high-risk prisoners, named Punta Carretas Penitentiary. In 1931 there was a jailbreak, in which a group of anarchists, including Miguel Arcángel Roscigna dug a tunnel from a business selling firewood and charcoal to the prison bathrooms so that the anarchist prisoners imprisoned for the assault on an currency exchange office in Centro, could escape. In September 1971, more than 110 prisoners from the far-left urban guerrilla group Tupamaros – National Liberation Movement escaped through a 40-meter tunnel.

Despite being an area close to Central Montevideo, for much of the first half of the 20th century it was sparsely populated, since it was associated with poor living conditions due to the existence of a large detention center. However, starting in the 50s, people began to inhabit its surroundings, which gave birth to the district of Punta Carretas.

After the end of the civil-military dictatorship, the prison was closed in 1986. In 1991 the building was bought by a real estate consortium that was in charge of remodeling it, and in 1994 the Punta Carretas Shopping mall was inaugurated. This brought in the opening of international chain hotels, haute cuisine restaurants, international clothing brands, new local business and high-rise apartments buildings to the area, which had positive impact on real estate prices, which turned the neighborhood into an upper-middle-class area of the city.

== Landmarks ==
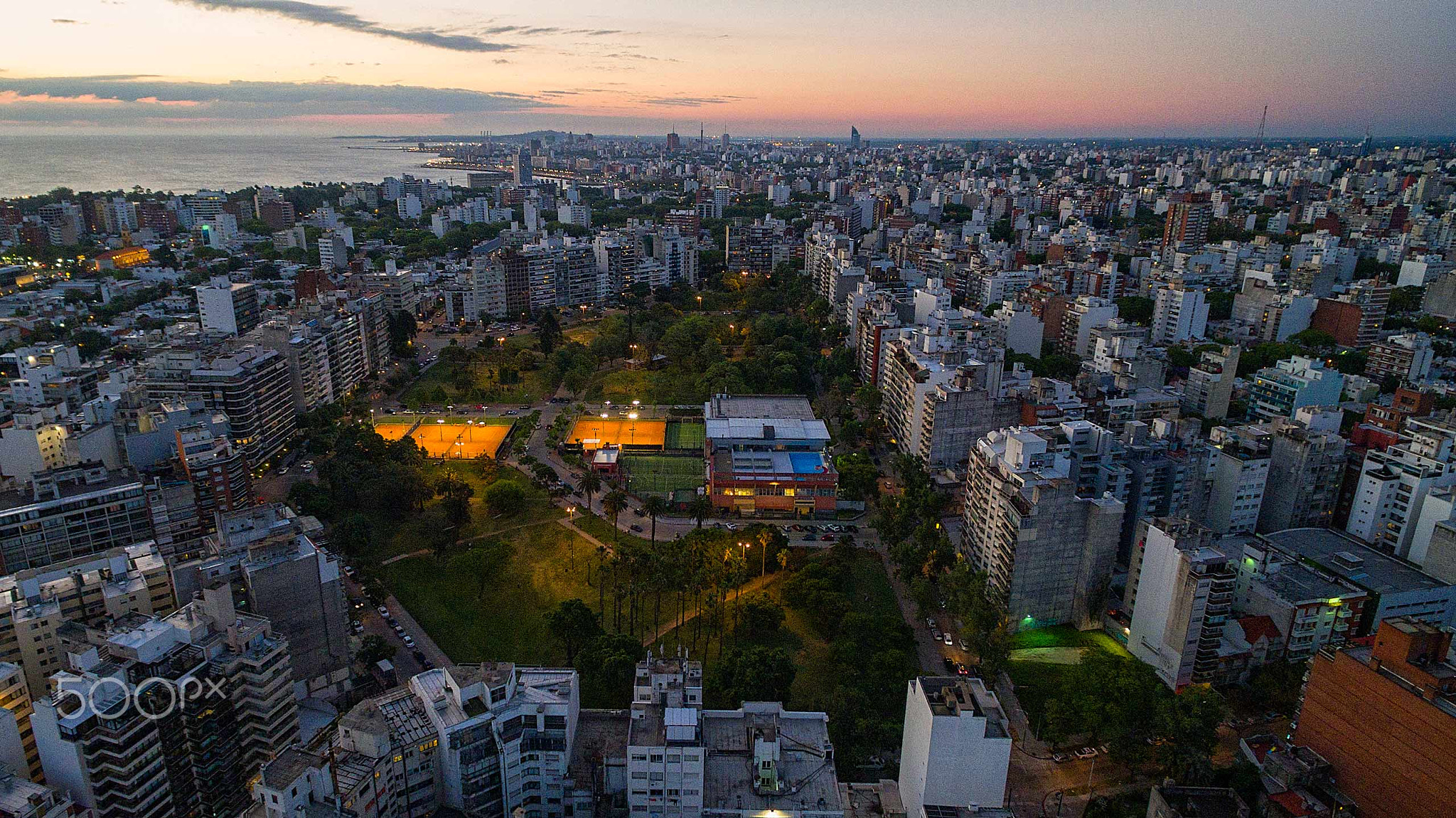
Aerial view of the neighborhood, with the Villa Biarritz park in the center

In the western zone is the Parque Rodó and the Club de Golf del Uruguay founded in 1922, on the land where a hippodrome operated in the last decades of the 19th century.

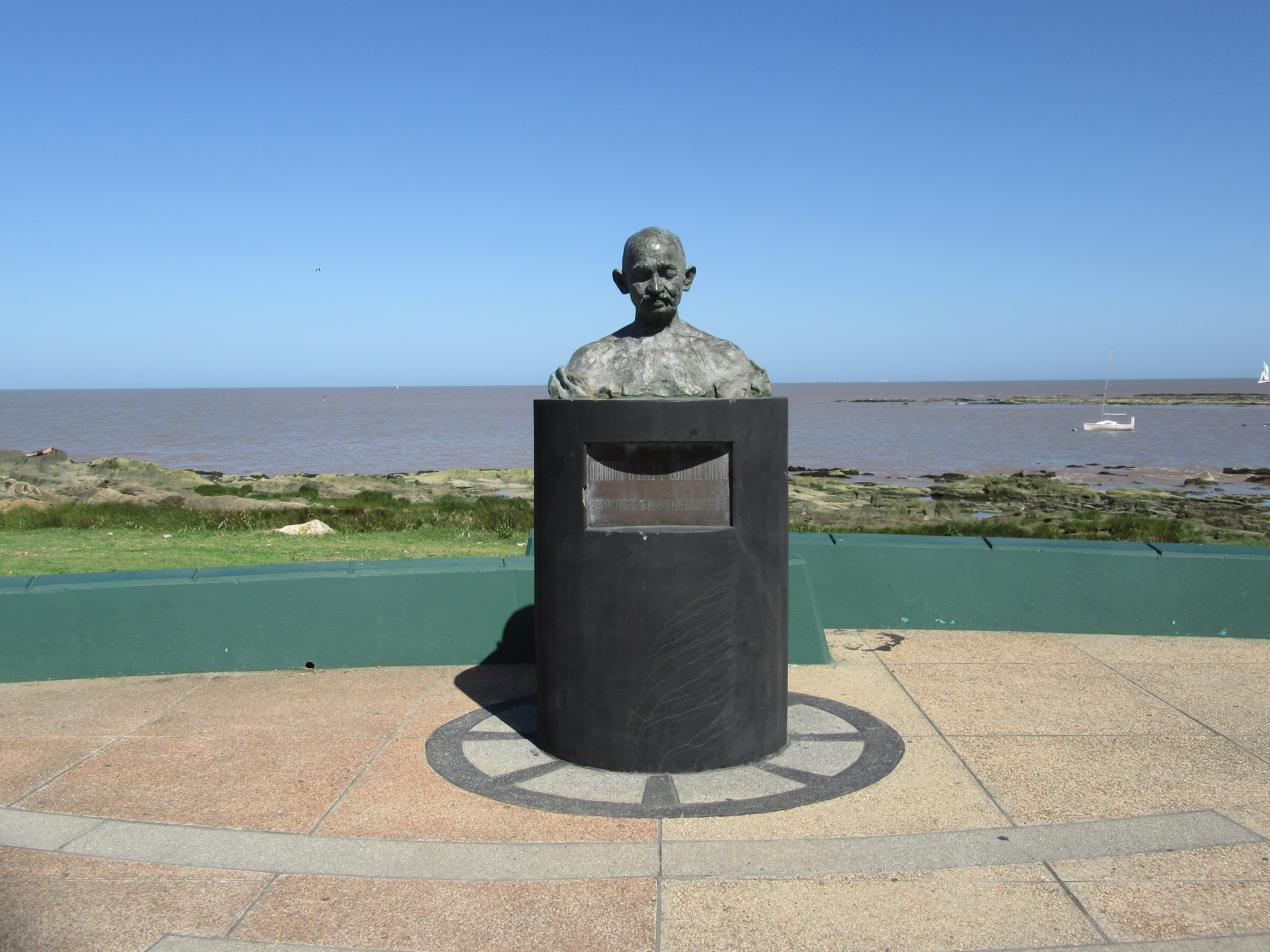
Mahatma Gandhi monument

On the Rambla (seaside avenue) there are a large number of apartment buildings, as well as some monuments, such as a statue of Mahatma Gandhi, a Holocaust memorial –built in 1994– and the Pittamiglio Castle, a building built by Humberto Pittamiglio from 1911 until his death in 1966, which combines Renaissance styles, and has many characteristics of medieval architecture. In Punta Brava, the southernmost point of the neighborhood, stands the homonymous lighthouse.

In the central area is Avenida Ellauri, the main road in the neighborhood. Throughout its extension, most businesses are concentrated, as well as the Punta Carretas Shopping mall and the Villa Biarritz Park, a green space in the middle of a highly urbanized area with a high population density, and where a flea market is held.

On Artigas Boulevard stands a neoclassical palace that houses the headquarters of Parva Domus, a civil, recreational and cultural association created in 1878, which for entertainment purposes proclaims itself as a micronational republic. In addition, in the neighborhood is the Zorrilla Museum, which exhibits belongings and documents of the Uruguayan poet Juan Zorrilla de San Martín. Inaugurated in 1943, sculptures by his son, José Luis, are also on display.

== Places of worship ==
- Parish Church of Our Lady of the Sacred Heart, popularly known as "Iglesia de Punta Carretas" (Roman Catholic)
- Uruguayan Jewish Community (Ashkenazi Jewish)

== See also ==
- Barrios of Montevideo
