= Adarme =

Outdated unit of mass

The adarme is an antiquated Spanish unit of mass, equal to three tomines, equivalent to 1/16 ounce (1.8 grams). The term derives from the Arabic درهم, parallel with drachm and the Greek δραχμἠ and persists in Spanish as an idiom for something insignificant or which exists in small quantity.
