= Postage stamps and postal history of Uruguay =

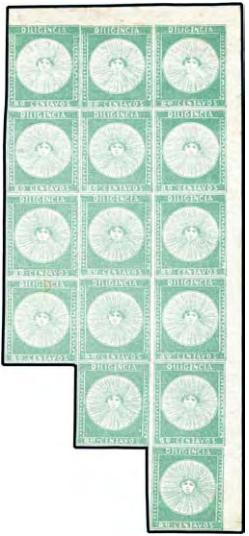
1856 'Diligencia' multiple, 'Ferrer block'

This is a survey of the postage stamps and postal history of Uruguay.

Uruguay is in the southeastern part of South America and has a population of over 3 million people, almost half of whom live in the capital Montevideo and its metropolitan area. Uruguay's only land border is with Rio Grande do Sul, Brazil, to the north. To the west lies the Uruguay River, to the southwest lies the estuary of Río de la Plata, with Argentina across the banks of either of those bodies of water, while to the southeast lies the Atlantic Ocean. Uruguay, at 177,880 square kilometres (68,679 sq mi), is the second-smallest nation of South America in terms of area after Suriname.

== Pre-stamp postal markings ==
=== Spanish crown period ===
In 1724 the Spanish Crown decided to establish a settlement on the east coast of Río de la Plata, with a view to countering the dominance of Portugal, which had contravened the Treaty of Tordesillas to found the Colonia de Sacramento opposite Buenos Aires. The building of the city, called San Felipe y Santiago de Montevideo, was completed towards the end of 1726. At this time, both Montevideo and Buenos Aires were virtually isolated from the other Spanish colonies in America. As early as 1748, the Governor of Buenos Aires organised scheduled transport services between that city and the villages within Peru and Chile. The first mail service, called El Príncipe, reached the port of Montevideo in May 1767. The regulations stated that the mailbags were to be delivered to the port of Montevideo, where the correspondence for Buenos Aires was transferred to launches. In 1785 a weekly overland service was introduced between Buenos Aires and Montevideo. The correspondence was carried in three launches called chasqueras (boats) as far as Colonia del Sacramento, where it was transferred to Montevideo by military couriers.

In February 1797 a weekly mail service was set up between Montevideo and Buenos Aires, with dedicated personnel who replaced the military couriers, and up to eight staging posts used. This service remained in operation until 1810, the year when the struggle for independence led by José Gervasio Artigas forced its suspension.

To relay the correspondence to the east of the territory, travelling along the road between Montevideo and the Fort of Santa Teresa, eleven staging posts were set up in 1798, and in 1799 the postal service was introduced which linked Montevideo, Minas and Cerro Largo. Following the First Treaty of San Ildefonso, signed in 1777, Spain governed the southern part of Uruguay, while the north remained in Portuguese hands. This situation was briefly interrupted in 1807, following the invasion of Montevideo by the British armed forces.

=== Independence ===
In 1811 Uruguay declared its independence, but the Spanish Crown did not withdraw from the territory until 1815, after the collapse of the Siege of Montevideo and the triumph of the Artiguista Revolution. However, in the following year the country was invaded by Portuguese troops, who governed from 1816 to 1824. Between 1824 and 1827, the Uruguayan territory was dominated by Brazil. In 1825, the struggle for the final independence of the country began, with the so-called Freedom Crusade (Cruzada Libertadora), led by Juan Antonio Lavalleja. On 25 August of that year, the independence of the country was declared, which took effect in 1830, with the Pledge of the Constitution and the nomination of Fructuoso Rivera as the first Constitutional President. Throughout this period, there were virtually no developments in the postal service, which began to be reorganised in 1827, when General Lavalleja appointed Luis de la Robla to act as Postal Director. On 11 January 1828, the first Provisional Regulations for the Postal Service were approved, and in July of that year De la Robla submitted the first General Mail Schedule to the government for approval.

=== Civil war ===
In 1839 the period of civil war called the Guerra Grande began. This continued until 1851, and throughout this time the entire country was dominated by revolutionaries, with only the city of Montevideo remaining in government hands. This situation had a very serious impact on the postal service within the country, while the service between Montevideo and abroad continued to operate regularly. During this period, the activities of the Montevideo Chamber of Commerce began to take on great importance. This institution was founded in 1835 by Jorge Tornquist, and operated as a sorting office for last minute mail, receiving commercial correspondence after the official mailbags had been sealed.

=== Government of Montevideo ===
The precarious economic situation of the Government of Montevideo led to the transfer of several sources of revenue, including those of the postal service. Early in 1846 the Board of Directors of the Purchasing Company took possession of the Postal Administration, which it retained until 1852, when it was returned to State ownership. One of the first measures adopted by the new administration was the organisation of a postal transport service to and from the interior of the country. For this purpose, Atanasio Lapido was nominated as Postal Contractor, with the task of installing staging posts throughout the country. These began to come into operation in May 1853. In April 1856 the General Postal Director, Miguel Solsona, left office, and Mr. Lapido also took over the post of Postal Director, on an unpaid basis.

== Currency ==
Before independence the currency and monetary system of the colonising country was adopted.

Year	Currency system
1800	8 reales = 1 peso = 1 peso fuerte = 800 centésimos
1839, June 20	1 peso or Patacón = 8 reales = 800 centésimos
1844	1 patacón = 960 centésimos
1846	1 real = 120 centésimos o reis
1862, June 23	1 peso plata = 100 centésimos

A law approved on 23 June 1862 shaped the final monetary system. The decimal system was adopted, taking as base unit the "Silver peso", consisting of 100 centésimos. All other monetary denominations prior to the approval of this law were abandoned.

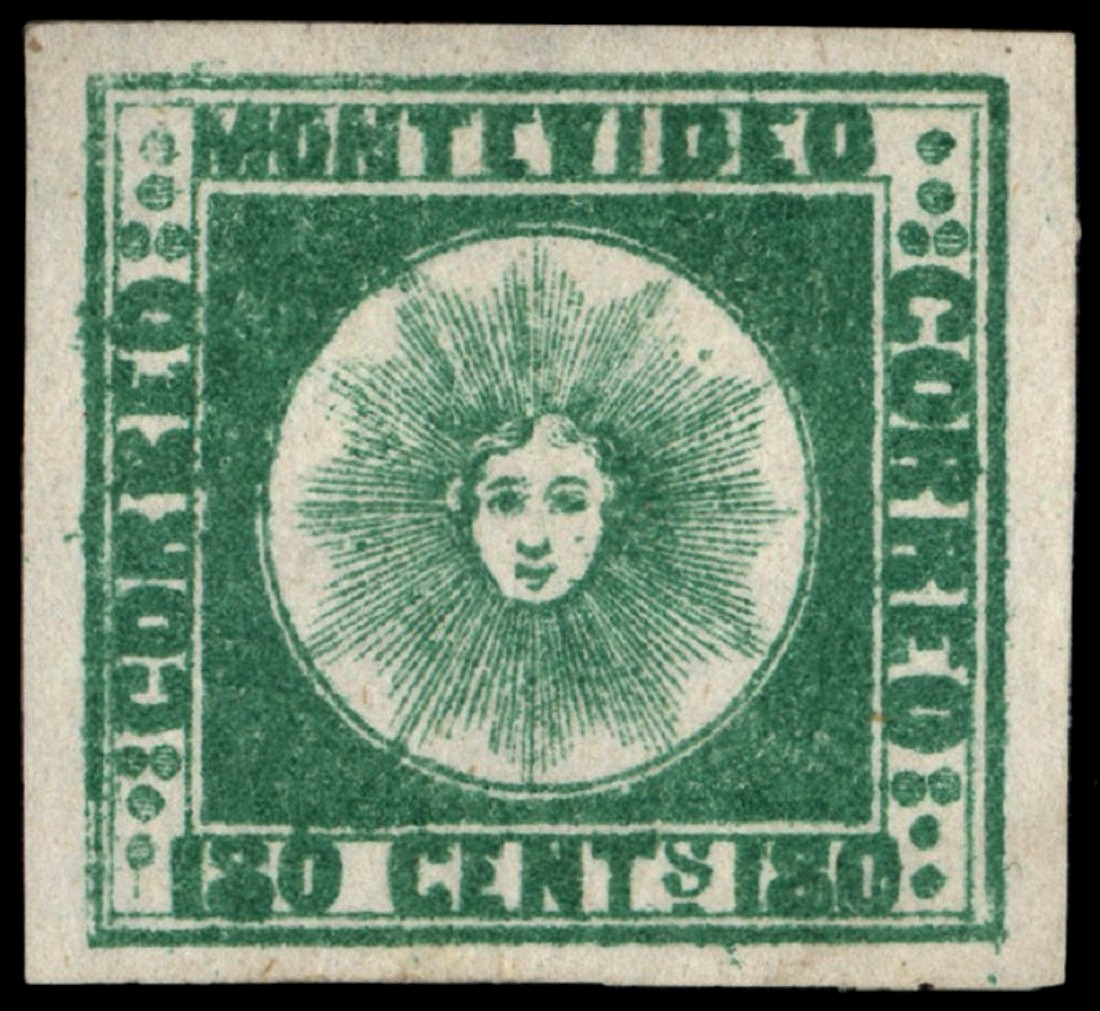
1858 180c green Sol de Montevideo private issue

== Postage stamps ==
=== Private issues ===
The postal services organised by the stagecoach companies, led by Mr. Lapido, issued on 1 October 1856 the so-called Diligencia (stagecoach stamp). This issue was intended for correspondence carried by stagecoach, solely for the domestic service. There were three values.

Satisfied with the results achieved with the Diligencia stamps, Mr. Lapido had a new series printed in 1858 for the franking of correspondence with the Republic of Argentina. This set also had three values and came to be known as Soles de Montevideo (Montevideo Suns) or Soles Doble Cifra (double cipher suns), as the value of each stamp was printed twice at the bottom of the stamp.

=== Government issues ===
At the end of 1857, Mr. Lapido resigned from the post of Director and was replaced by Prudencio Echevarriarza. He continued the reforms and presented a proposal to the government for the application of postal stamps for correspondence between every point in the country. This was approved and laid down in the Uruguay Mail decree of 11 June 1859. In article 1 it states: "All correspondence will be franked by postal stamps, without which no letters will be delivered by the General Postal Administration or any of its branch offices, the only locations where exchanges of mail may take place."

==== Definitives ====
The first regular series of stamps with government approval was issued on 1 July 1859, resembling the second private 'Sol de Montevideo' issue. Since 1859, many Uruguayan definitive stamp series have been released. Besides different designs, there were additions and changes involving the postal rates, changes in currency were also reflected on the stamps: the silver peso system in 1862.

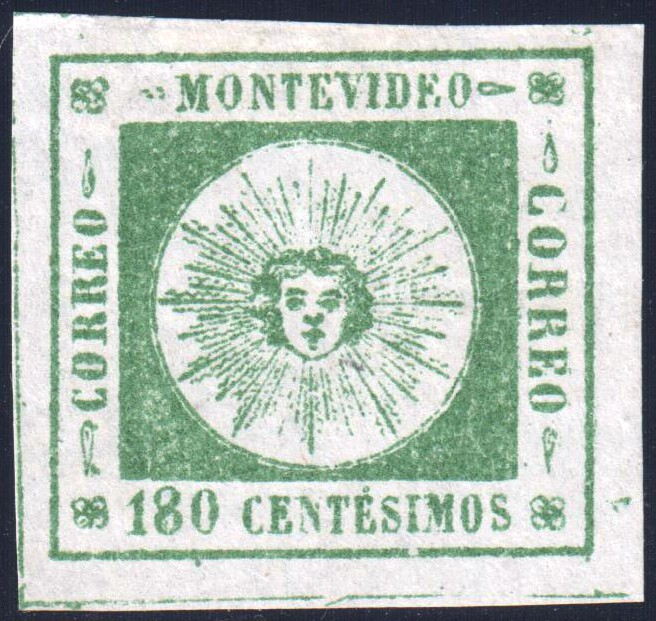
180c green, 1859 issue, unused

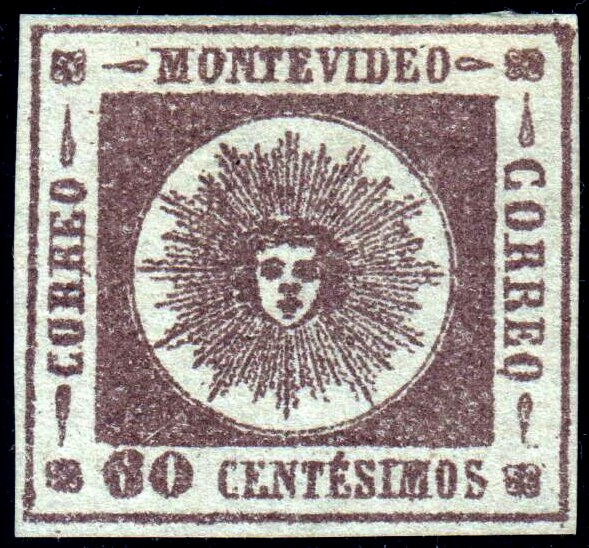
60c brown lilac, 1860 issue, unused

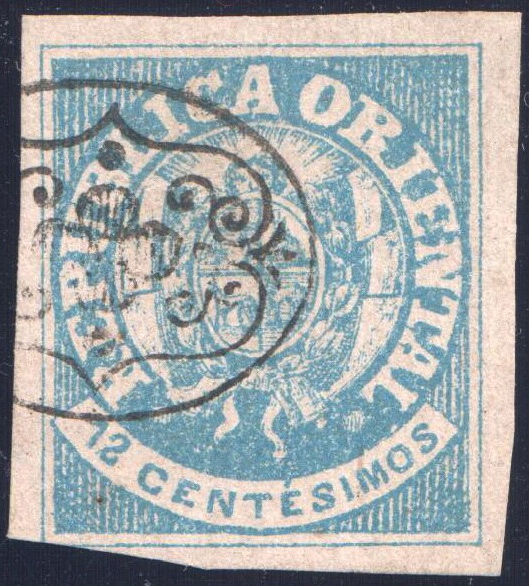
12 centesimos blue, 1864 issue, used by fancy cancel from Montevideo

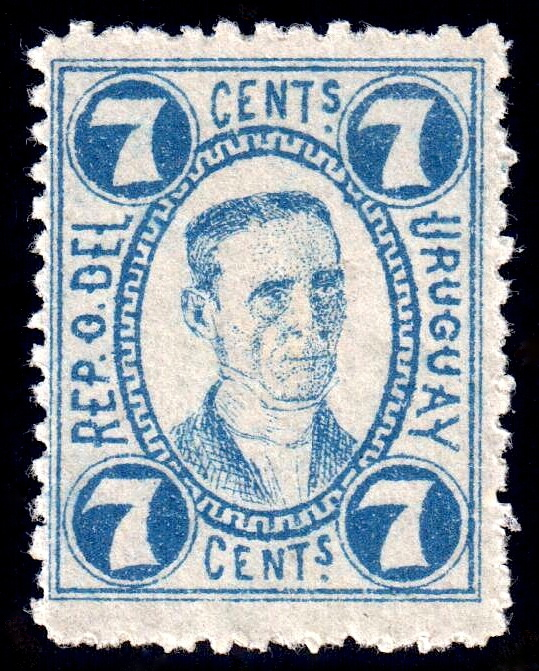
7 centesimos blue, 1881 issue, unused. Depicts Joaquín Suárez

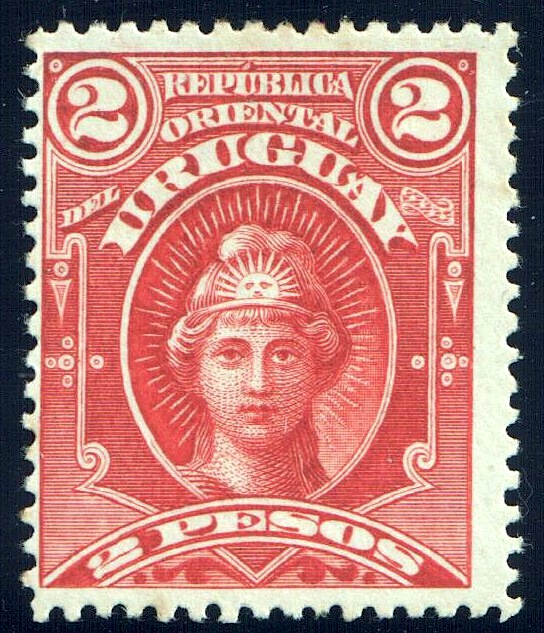
2p carmine, 1894, unused

==== Commemoratives ====
Uruguayan postage stamps have been released to commemorate a wide variety of topics, such as Uruguayan notable events (e.g. the end of the civil war in 1897) and anniversaries, aspects of life and culture, famous Uruguayan people (statesmen, religious, literary and cultural figures, athletes, etc.), fauna and flora, works of art, and Christmas. International events have also been commemorated.

The unveiling of a monument in Bella Vista, Montevideo to former President Joaquín Suárez (in office 1843–52) was the occasion of the first commemorative set of three stamps, issued on 18 July 1896. They were engraved by Waterlow and Sons in London.

Up to 2007 more than 2,200 different definitive and commemorative stamps have been issued in Uruguay.

==== Overprints ====
Changes in postal rates were published on 6 September 1865, this called for new stamps. Before 1866 stamps were solely supplied from Montevideo but in 1865 the Uruguay postal authorities ordered a new set of stamps abroad, in London at Maclure, Macdonald and Co. The set did not arrive in time and the 1864 issue had to be overprinted with the new denominations as emergency measure. The first overprinted, provisional stamp set of Uruguay was a fact.

Surcharging of remainder stocks of stamps for usage as regular stamps would be applied more often due to supply problems and printing errors but also for commemorative purposes. The 19th century has 10 overprint issues, and the next century twice as much.

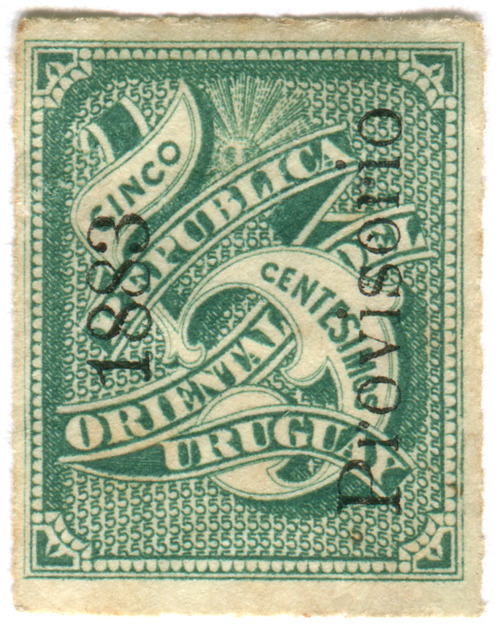
1883, 5c of 1877 overprinted 1883 Provisorio

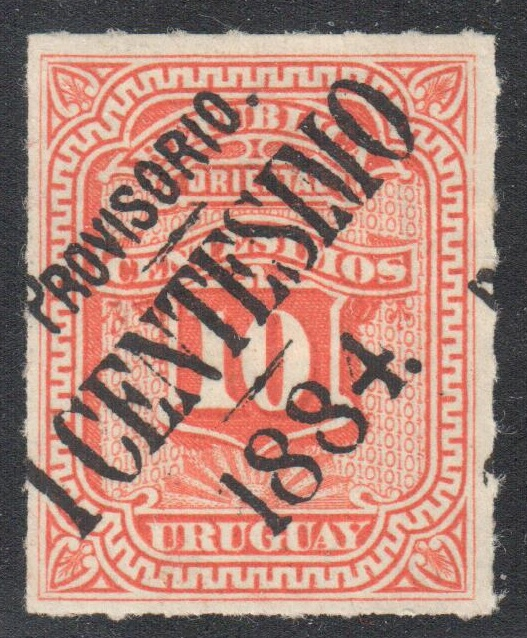
1c orange red, 1884, overprinted Provisorio – 1 centesimo – 1884

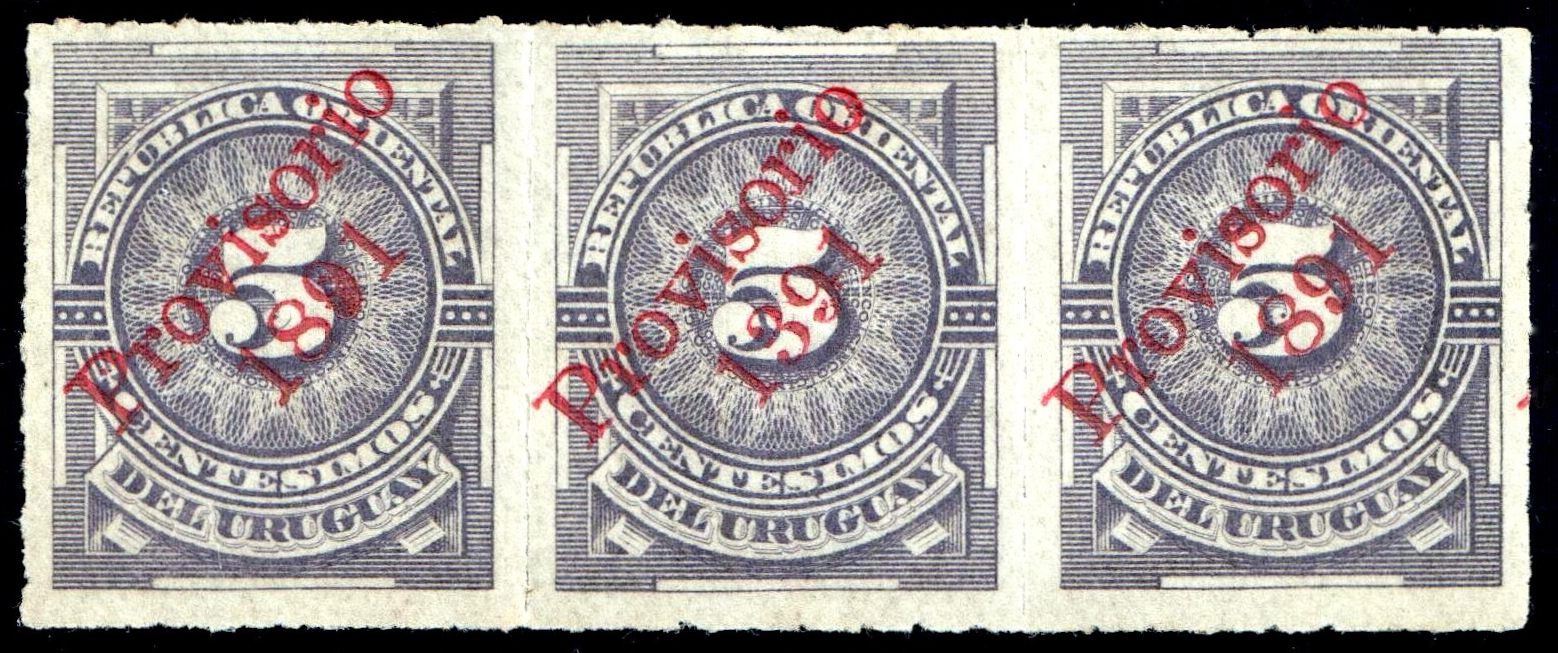
5c violet 1891 strip of three, middle stamp with Provisorio 1391 instead of Provisorio 1891 overprint

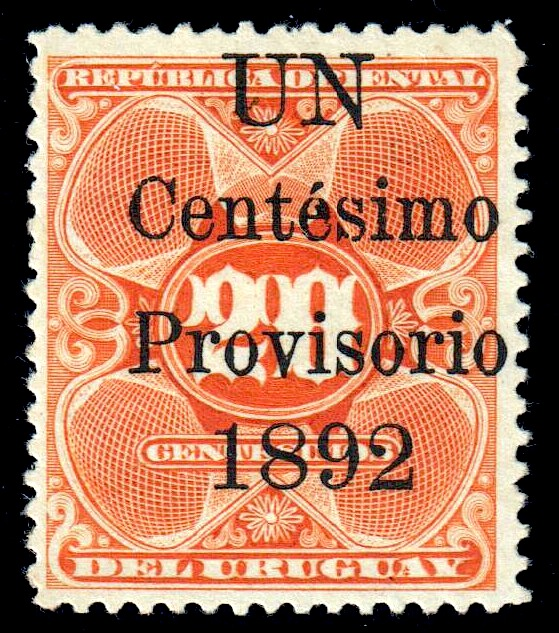
1c black surcharge on 20c orange issue of 1889–1901, unused

Regular stamps were also overprinted to indicate a special purpose; intended for airmail, official mail, special delivery, postage due or newspapers.

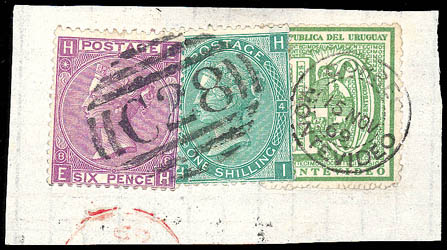
Fragment with oval coded obliterator 'C28' of the British Post Office in Montevideo

=== Foreign consulate mail ===
There are very few covers addressed to transatlantic destinations before 1872 using Uruguayan stamps. This was the result of illicit actions by the foreign consulates in Montevideo, who received and despatched mail using ships flying the flags of their own states, with no involvement of any kind by the Uruguayan Mail Service. The British consulate in Montevideo used British stamps between 1862 and 1872 which may be identified by the cancel 'C28'. Overseas correspondence was franked with Uruguayan stamps from the end of 1872 onwards, following the so-called Montevideo Postal Incident in which the government prohibited all non-Uruguay mail inside Uruguay.

== Pillar boxes ==
In 1879 Uruguay imported a batch of nine cast iron pillar boxes made by Cochrane & Co of Dudley, England. These followed a hexagonal design created by the English architect John Penfold for the General Post Office, but cast with Spanish lettering and the Uruguayan coat of arms in place of the English lettering and royal insignia of the original. Some survive and some are still in service. In 1993 the Correo Uruguayo commemorated its Penfold post boxes with a set of stamps of 50c, $1 and $2.60.

== See also ==
- Currency of Uruguay
