= Alfonso Tort =

Uruguayan actor (born 1978)

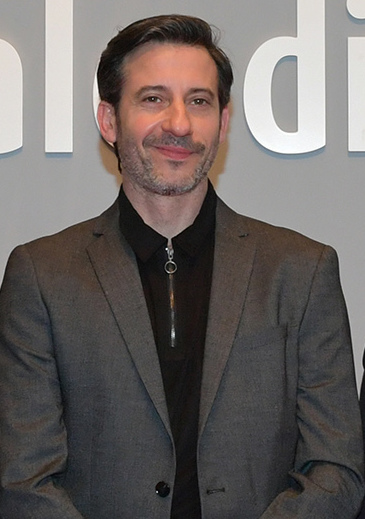
- Tort in 2018
- Born: Alfonso Tort Guida; September 6, 1978 (age 48); Montevideo, Uruguay
- Education: Margarita Xirgu Multidisciplinary School of Dramatic Art
- Occupation: Actor
- Years active: 2000–present

Alfonso Tort Guida (born 6 September 1978) is a Uruguayan actor. He made his film debut in 25 Watts (2001) and has since appeared in numerous film, stage, and television productions, including A Twelve-Year Night (2018) and Family Album (2023).

== Early life and education ==
Tort was born 1978 in Montevideo to architects and owners of a toy workshop, Hugo Tort and Beatriz Guida. He grew up in the Punta Gorda neighbourhood and attended Escuela N° 17, Colegio Latinoamericano and Liceo Joaquin Suarez. During his youth he played soccer as a member of the Huracán Buceo team.

After graduating from high school, he began to study psychomotor education, but dropped out and later enrolled in the Margarita Xirgu Multidisciplinary School of Dramatic Art in 2000.

== Career ==
While still studying drama, Tort made his professional acting debut in the 2001 comedy drama 25 watts.

== Filmography ==
=== Film ===
Year	Title	Role	Ref.
2001	25 watts	Seba	
2004	Whisky	Juan Carlos	
2006	Crónica de una fuga (Chronicle of an Escape)	Jorge	
2007	Capital, todo el mundo va a Buenos Aires	Sergio Astier	
2014	El 5 de Talleres (The Midfielder)	Negro Iono	
2016	Era el Cielo	Belvedere	
2017	Las Olas	Alfonso	
2018	La Noche de 12 Años (A Twelve-Year Night)	Eleuterio Fernández Huidobro	
2019	Fantasma vuelve al pueblo	Demóstenes	
2020	Las intemperies	Lorenzo	
2022	Legítima defensa	Eduardo Pastore	
2023	Temas propios (Family Album)	Yañez	
2023	No me Rompan (Women on the Edge)	Ramiro	

=== Television ===
Year	Title	Role	Ref.
2007	Piso 8	Maximiliano Caubarrere	
2016	Rotos y descosidos	Pedro	
2017	El Hipnotizador	Gómez	
2021–2023	Barrabrava	Oscar	
2023–2026	El reino	Martínez Sotelo	
2024	Terapia alternativa	Amadeo	
2025	Amia	Bruno Galiatri	
