= AMIA (TV series) =

- Genre: Action; Drama; Spy thriller
- Created by: Givon Snir; Shuky Gur
- Showrunner: Givon Snir
- Directed by: Guillermo Rocamora
- Starring: Michael Aloni; Malena Sánchez; Alfonso Tort
- Countries of origin: Israel; Argentina; Uruguay
- Original languages: Hebrew; Spanish; English
- No. of seasons: 1
- No. of episodes: 8

Production
- Executive producers: Givon Snir; Shuki Gur; Nadav Palti; Yair Dori; Tamar Mozes Borovitz; Eytan Stibbe; Roy Zipris; Udi Segal; Javier Barboza
- Production locations: Montevideo, Uruguay
- Cinematography: Gerardo González
- Running time: 35–40 minutes
- Production companies: Dori Media Group; Cimarrón Cine

Original release
- Network: Reshet 13
- Release: 13 February – 20 March 2025

Amia (Hebrew: המטרה: אמיא; Target: AMIA) also known as Amia: el fin de la verdad (English: Amia: the end of the truth) is an Israeli political action thriller television series based on the 1992 bombing of the Israeli embassy in Buenos Aires and the 1994 AMIA bombing. Produced by Dori Media Group and filmed in Uruguay, it was released on Reshet 13 on February 13, 2025.

== Premise ==
The series follows several characters in the context of two terrorist attacks against the Argentine Jewish community in the 1990s. Diego (Michael Aloni), an Israeli Mossad agent who loses his sister in the bombing of the Israeli embassy in Buenos Aires, teams up with journalist Gisela Berruti (Malena Sánchez) to find those responsible, as their investigation unfolds alongside the 1994 AMIA bombing. Meanwhile, Bruno Galiatri (Alfonso Tort), an agent of the Secretariat of Intelligence, is assigned to the investigation, seeking to bring the case to a swift resolution and mitigate its broader impact on the Argentine government.

== Cast ==
=== Main ===
- Michael Aloni as Diego, a Mossad agent based in Montevideo who loses his sister in the embassy bombing and becomes involved in efforts to identify those responsible.
- Alfonso Tort as Bruno Galiatri, a SIDE agent assigned to investigate the attack.
- Malena Sánchez as Gisela Berruti, an incisive journalist who initially covers the events live and later begins her own investigation amid inconsistencies in the information.

=== Recurring ===
- César Bordón as the Secretary of Government who tasks Bruno with investigating the attack and attempts to resolve the matter quickly in order to limit its impact on the Argentine government.
- Uli Sternberg as Avner Gilat, the head of security at the Israeli embassy.
- Oscar Pernas como Nabil Khaled, a suspect from the Triple Frontier accused of involvement in the embassy attack.
- Adam Karst as Yosef, the head of the Mossad investigation.
- Tali Osadchi as Fernanda, a Mossad agent searching for those responsible for the attack and Diego's romantic partner, who opposes his involvement in the investigation due to his sister's death in the bombing.
- Soledad Pelayo Alonso as Gloria, the producer of the news program where Gisela works.
- Álvaro Armand Ugón as Rafael, a news anchor covering the attack who conflicts with Gisela over her reluctance to adhere to the official narrative.

=== Guest ===
- Rogelio Gracia Bernadá as Israeli Ambassador
- Doron Talmon as Noemí, Diego's sister who was killed in the embassy bombing.

== Production ==
=== Development ===
The series was announced in November 2022 by Nadav Palti, CEO of Dori Media Group, as an eight-episode production titled AMIA, created by writers Givon Snir and Shuky Gur. Earlier that year, Uruguayan director Guillermo Rocamora had been attached to the project, with Izhar Harlev serving as writer. The series was set to air on the Israeli network Reshet 13, with international distribution handled by Dori Media International, and was produced as a co-production between Yair Dori Holdings and Uruguayan company Cimarrón Cine.

The cast of was announced in June 2023, comprising Israeli, Uruguayan and Argentine actors. In November, the series was presented to international buyers at the tenth edition of MIPCOM Cancún, as well as at industry markets in Cannes.

=== Filming ===
Filming took place in Uruguay between May and September 2023. Locations included Central Montevideo and the Ciudad Vieja district of Montevideo, both of which doubled for Buenos Aires, as well as Punta del Este, where landmarks such as Casapueblo were featured.

== Release ==
The limited series premiered in Israel on February 13, 2025, on Reshet 13, where it aired weekly on Thursdays until March 20, 2025. It was released on the streaming platform Flow for Latin American audiences on July 17, 2025, and premiered in Argentina on Telefe the following day, July 18, 2025, coinciding with the 31st anniversary of the 1994 AMIA bombing.

The series was nominated for Best Fiction at the 54th Martín Fierro Awards, while Ricamora received a nomination for Best Director, Bordón for Best Actor, and the writing team for Best Screenplay.
