= Plan A (film) =

- Directed by: Yoav Paz; Doron Paz
- Based on: Vengeance and Retribution Are Mine by Dina Porat
- Starring: August Diehl; Michael Aloni; Sylvia Hoeks
- Release date: 2021
- Running time: 109 minutes
- Language: English

Plan A is a 2021 film written and directed by Yoav and Doron Paz.

== Plot ==
In post-war occupied Germany, the Nakam paramilitary organization, consisting of traumatized Holocaust survivors led by Abba Kovner, plans to murder six million German people as indiscriminate revenge for the Holocaust and other crimes. With this goal in mind, Kovner leads Nakam in a plan to poison the drinking water in multiple major German cities, intending this to be only the beginning.

== Cast ==
- August Diehl as Max (alias Paul Baumann)
- Sylvia Hoeks as Anna
- Michael Aloni as Michael
- Nikolai Kinski as Tzvi
- Milton Welsh as Belkin
- Oz Zehavi as Menash
- Yoel Rozenkier as Yochai
- Ishai Golan as Abba Kovner
- Yehuda Almagor as Avraham
- Michael Brandner as Foreman
- Tim Wilde as Willi
- Mishchuk Oleksandr Yuriiovych as British Sergeant
- Kai Ivo Baulitz as Bruno
- Andriy Morochynskyi as Haganah Man #1
- Olexandr Shevchenko as Haganah Man #2
- Petra Berndt as Neighbour Woman #1
- Ulrike von Gawlowski as Neighbour Woman #2
- Eckhard Preuß as Clemens
- Ostap Ripka as Jewish Brigade #1
- Marian Shpytak as Jewish Brigade #2
- Vitaliy Vihot as Jewish Brigade #3
- Barbara Bauer as Clemens' Wife
- Gerhard Georg Jilka as Josef
- Sina Bianca Hentschel as Clerk
- Barbara Herschbach as Bruno's Wife
- Yossi Behar as Scientist
- Amitai Keidar as Effraim
- Marlon Maier as Benjamin
- Sveda Polat as Ruth
- Aenne Schwarz as Woman in Tent

== Production and distribution ==
Plan A was written and directed by Yoav and Doron Paz. Filming took place in Germany, Israel, and Ukraine. It is based on Israeli historian Dina Porat's book Vengeance and Retribution Are Mine, about the Nakam.

Signature Entertainment obtained distribution rights in the United Kingdom, Ireland, Australia, and New Zealand. Twelve Oaks Pictures obtained distribution rights in Spain.

== Reception ==
The Guardian's Cath Clarke rated the film two out of five stars.
