= Harmatz (surname) =

Harmatz (Hebrew: חרמץ), also spelled Charmatz, Charmaz, Kharmatz, and Kharmaz is a Hebrew surname. Notable people with this surname include:

- Joseph Harmatz (1925–2016), Lithuanian-born Jewish partisan fighter during World War II.
- William Harmatz (1931–2011), American-born jockey
