= Nuestra Señora de Fátima =

Nuestra Señora de Fátima is the Spanish name for Our Lady of Fátima.

Nuestra Señora de Fátima may also refer to:

- Nuestra Señora de Fátima (Buenos Aires Premetro) - a station on the Premetro E2 line in Buenos Aires, Argentina.
- Nuestra Señora de Fátima, Pocitos, Montevideo - A church in Montevideo, Uruguay.
