= Family Album (2023 film) =

- Theatrical release poster
- Spanish: Temas propios
- Literally: Own Themes
- Directed by: Guillermo Rocamora
- Written by: Guillermo Rocamora
- Produced by: Hernán Musaluppi; Diego Robino; Santiago López Rodríguez; Lilia Scenna
- Starring: Diego Cremonesi; Franco Rizzaro; Valeria Lois; Alfonso Tort; Vicente Pieri; Roberto Suárez
- Cinematography: Julián Apezteguia
- Edited by: Fernando Epstein; Eliane Katz
- Production company: Cimarrón Cine
- Release date: August 24, 2023
- Running time: 91 minutes
- Countries: Uruguay; Argentina
- Languages: Spanish; English

Family Album (Spanish: Temas propios, lit. 'Own Themes') is a 2023 comedy film written and directed by Guillermo Rocamora. It is about a family where César, the father, and Manuel, the eldest son, decide to set up their own musical group, but generational differences and musical tastes make the band unsustainable. Starring Diego Cremonesi, Franco Rizzaro, Valeria Lois, Alfonso Tort, Vicente Pieri and Roberto Suárez. It premiered on August 24, 2023, in Uruguayan theaters.

It was selected as the Uruguayan entry for the Best International Feature Film at the 96th Academy Awards, but it was not nominated.

== Synopsis ==
César is 45 years old but he looks like a teenager. He is an immature and abandoned father who feels liberated and rejuvenated since the divorce. Virginia is 47 years old and teaches English in her kitchen at home. She is a mother overwhelmed by work, her adolescent children and the separation. Manuel is 18 years old, he is a musical genius in the middle of a vocation crisis. Agustín is 15 years old and they are about to kick him out of school. In the middle of the family storm, César and Manuel have no better idea than to form a music band, the dream that César could not fulfill. But the generational clash between them makes the family band unsustainable.

== Cast ==
The actors participating in this film are:

- Diego Cremonesi as César
- Franco Rizzaro as Manuel
- Valeria Lois as Virginia
- Alfonso Tort as Yañez
- Vicente Luan as Agustín
- Roberto Suárez as Charly
- Ángela Torres as Eli

== Production ==
Principal photography began on December 1, 2021, in Montevideo, Uruguay.

== Accolades ==
Year	Award	Category	Recipient	Result	Ref
2023	24th ACCU Awards	Best Uruguayan Feature Film	Family Album	Nominated	
2023	24th ACCU Awards	Best Director	Guillermo Rocamora	Nominated	
2023	24th ACCU Awards	Best Actor	Franco Rizzaro	Won	
2023	24th ACCU Awards	Best Supporting Actor	Diego Cremonesi	Nominated	
2023	24th ACCU Awards	Best Supporting Actress	Valeria Lois	Won	
2023	24th ACCU Awards	Best Screenplay	Guillermo Rocamora	Nominated	
2023	24th ACCU Awards	Best Original Score	Martín Rivero	Won	
2023	24th ACCU Awards	Best Art Direction	Gonzalo Delgado	Won	
2023	24th ACCU Awards	Best Sound	Catriel Vildosola	Won	
2023	24th ACCU Awards	Revelation Award	Vicente Pieri	Won	

== See also ==
- List of submissions to the 96th Academy Awards for Best International Feature Film
- List of Uruguayan submissions for the Academy Award for Best International Feature Film
