= Yavne Synagogue =

Synagogue in Montevideo, Uruguay

- Spanish: Sinagoga Yavne
- Location of the synagogue in Montevideo

Religion
- Affiliation: Judaism
- Ecclesiastical or organizational status: Synagogue
- Status: Active

Location
- Location: Centro, Montevideo
- Country: Uruguay
- Interactive map of Yavne Synagogue
- Coordinates: 34°54′37″S 56°09′17″W

The Yavne Synagogue (Spanish: Sinagoga Yavne) is a congregation and synagogue, located in the Pocitos neighbourhood of Montevideo, Uruguay. The synagogue is co-located with Instituto Yavne, a Jewish school.

== See also ==
- History of the Jews in Uruguay
- List of synagogues in Uruguay
