= Pocitos =

- Barrio
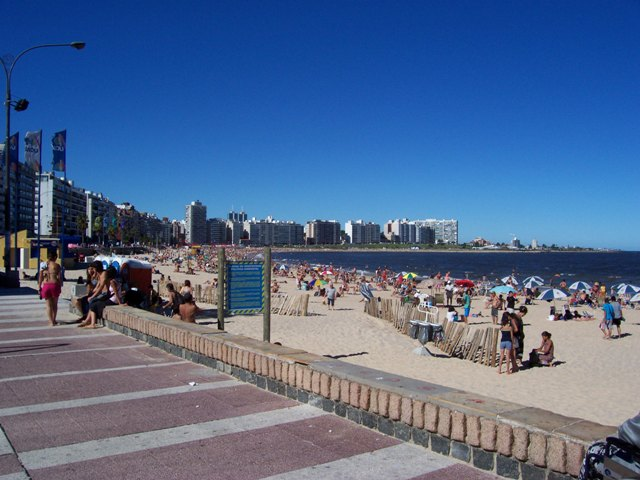
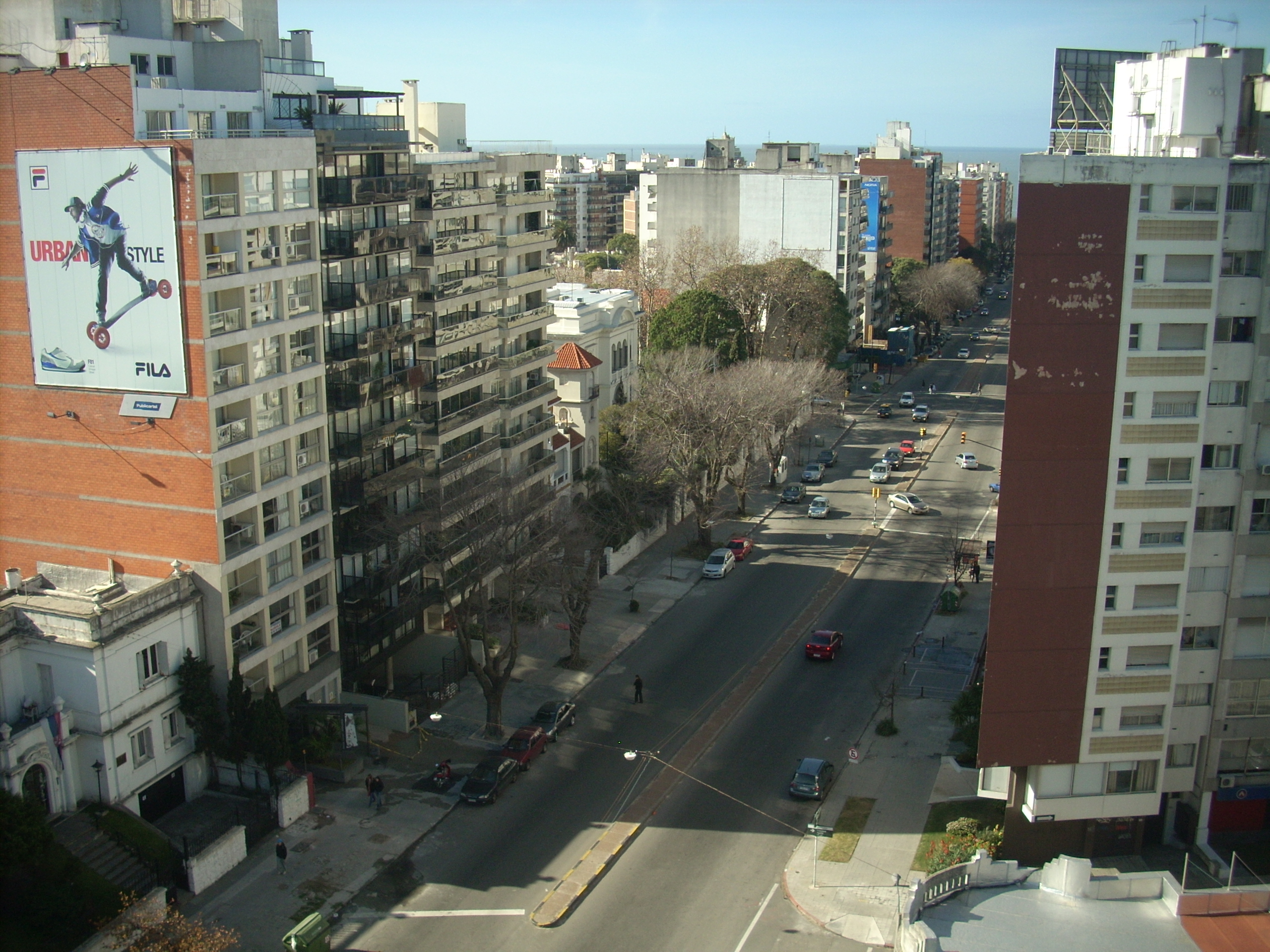
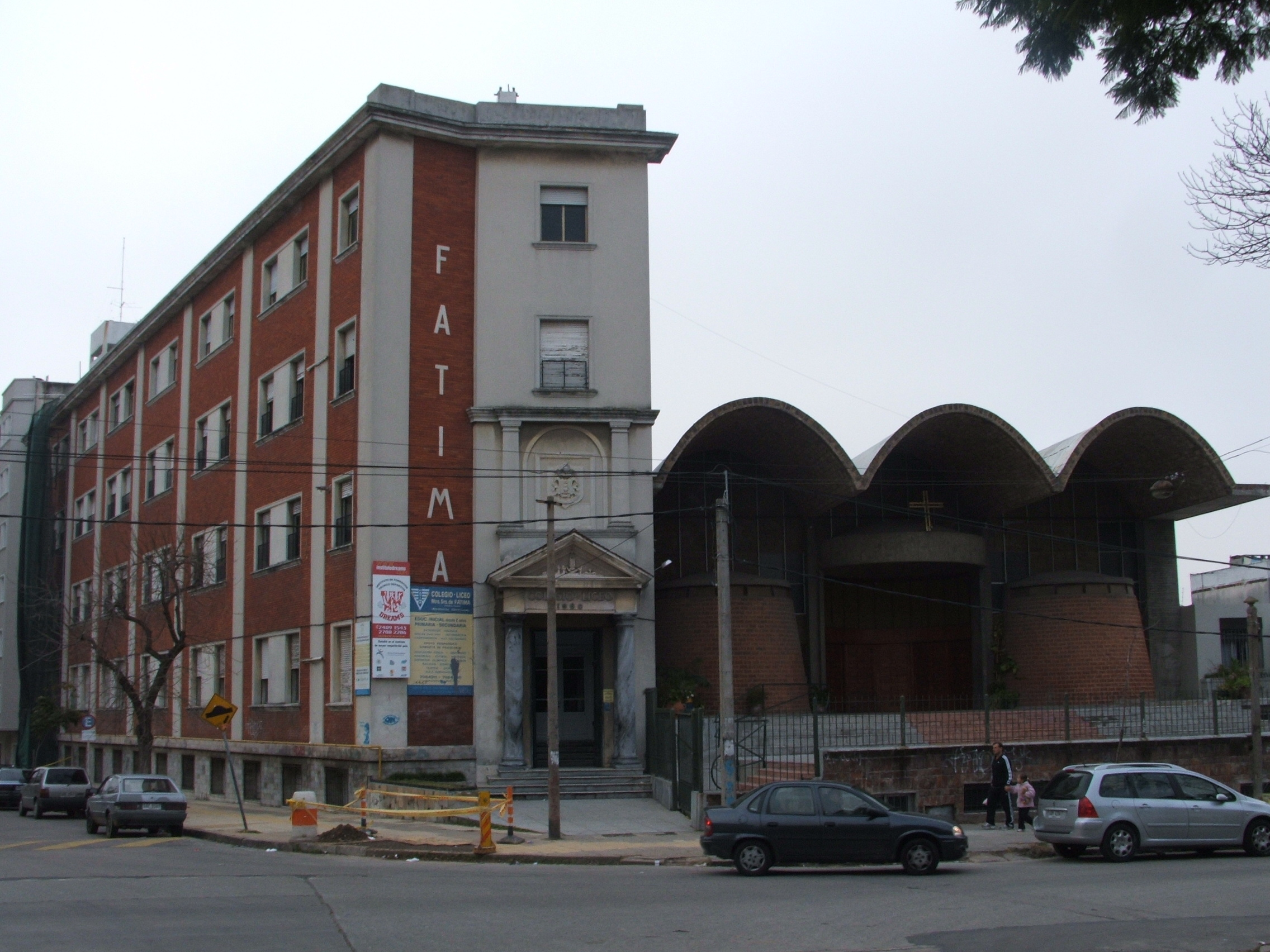
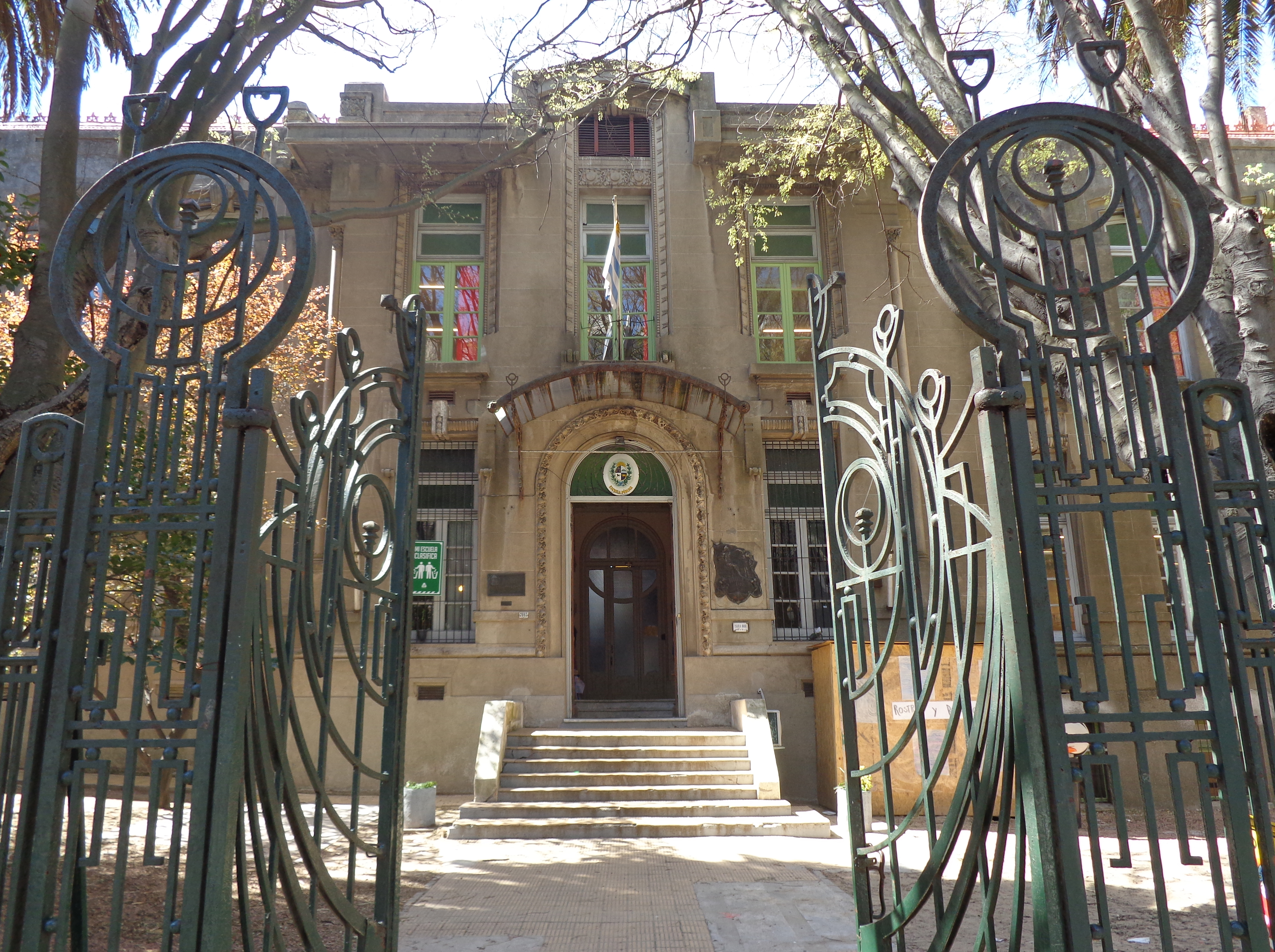
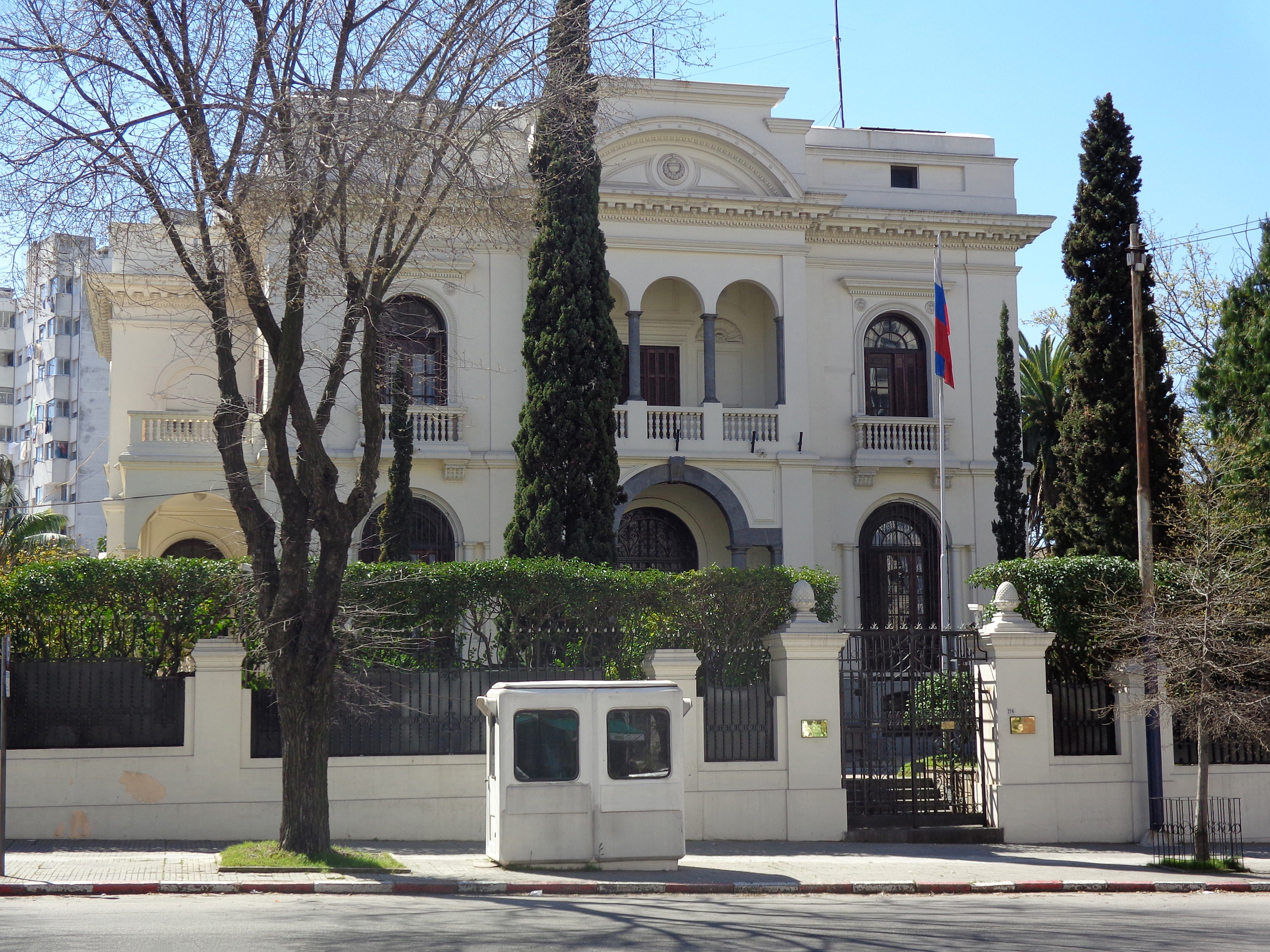
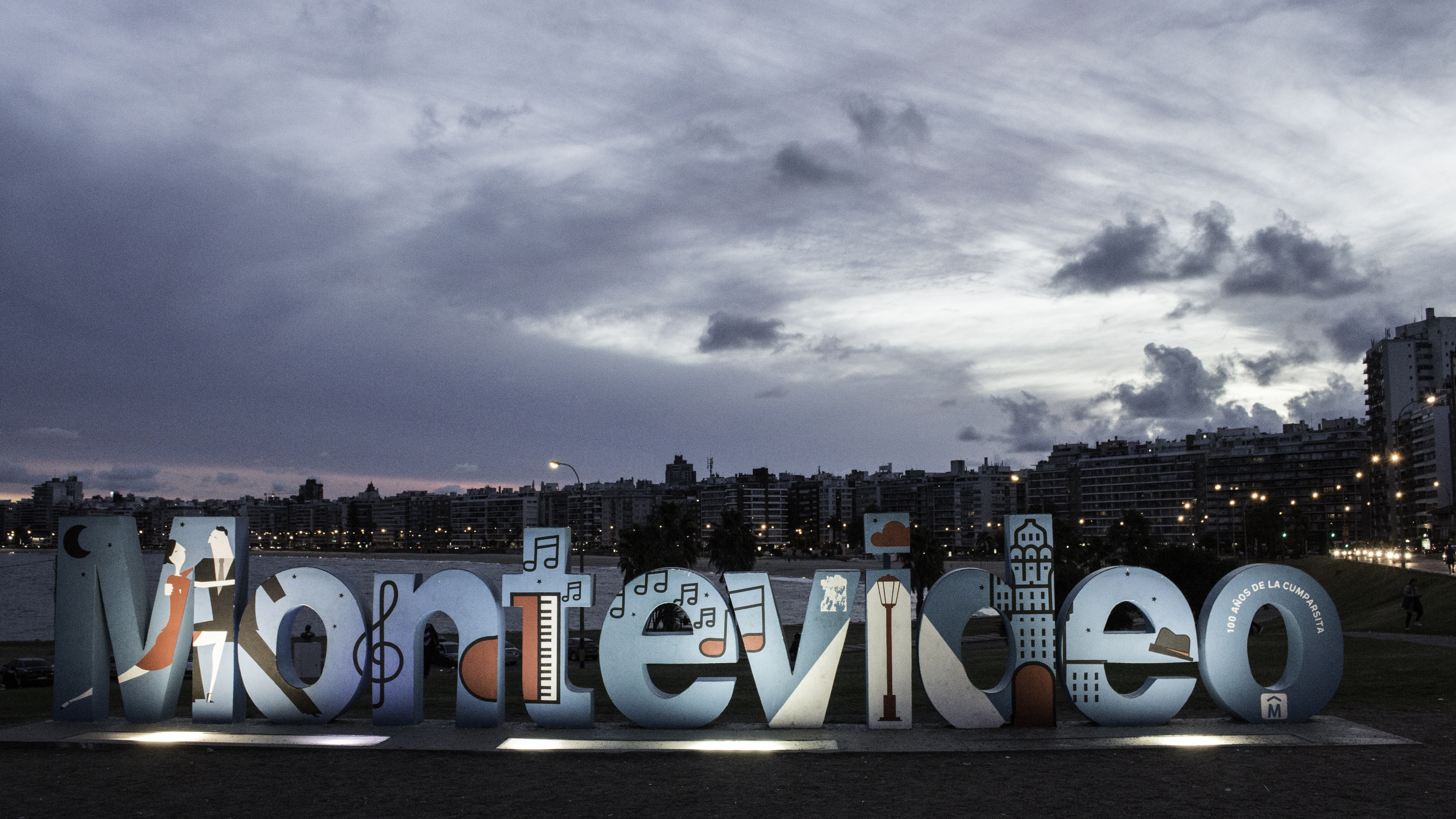
- Pocitos Beach Spain Boulevard Church of Our Lady of Fatima Public School No. 17 Russian Embassy Montevideo Sign Pocitos Beach in Montevideo

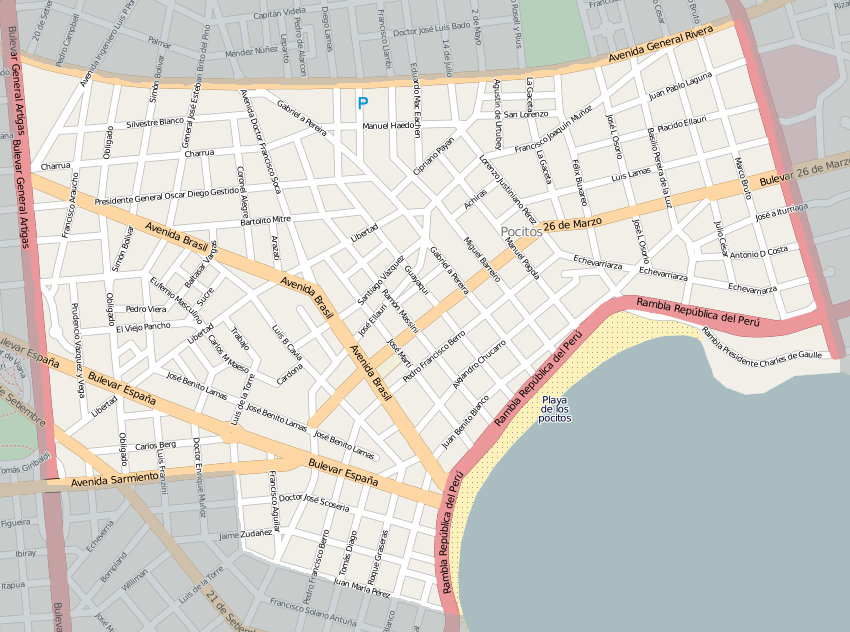
- Street map of Pocitos

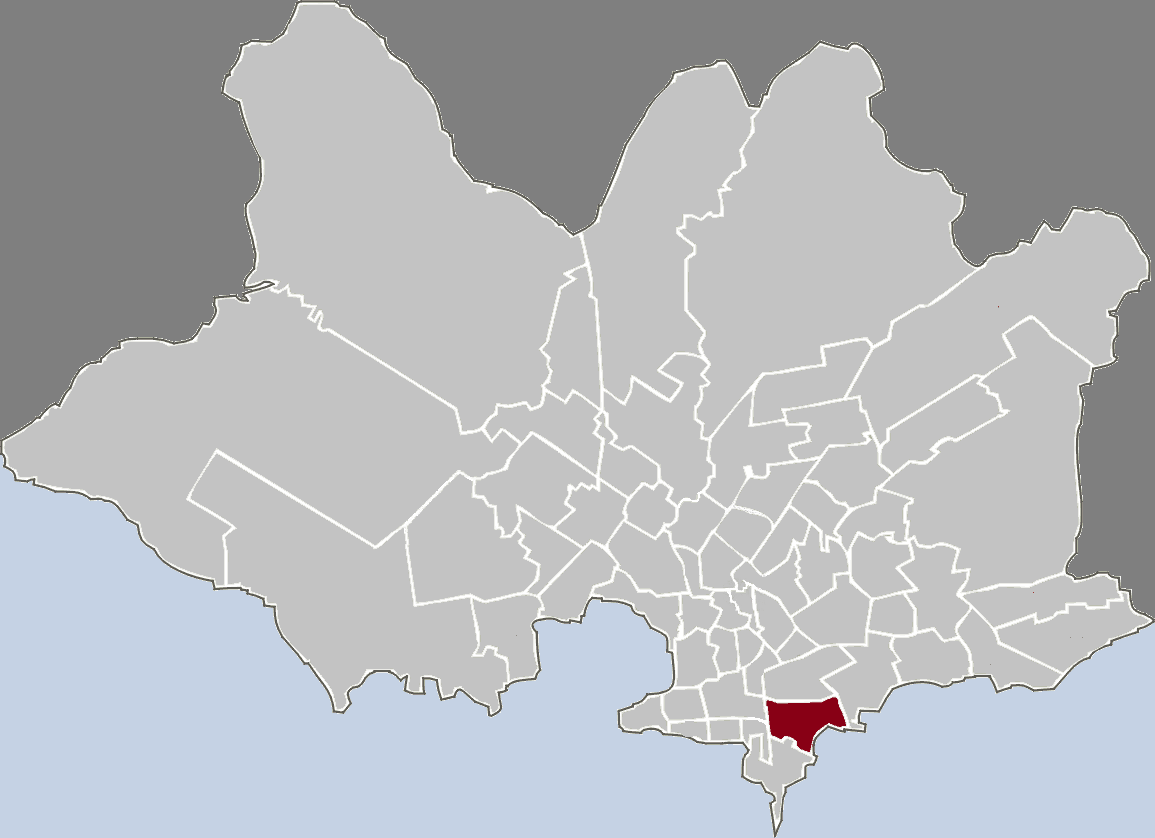
- Location of Pocitos in Montevideo
- Coordinates: 34°54′30″S 56°9′0″W
- Country: Uruguay
- Department: Montevideo Department
- City: Montevideo

Pocitos is an upscale seaside barrio of Montevideo, Uruguay. It borders Buceo to the east, Parque Batlle to the north, Tres Cruces, Cordón and Parque Rodó to the west and Punta Carretas to the south.

Pocitos is politically included in the CH Municipality of Montevideo, and located along the banks of the Rio de la Plata, it is one of the most famous beaches in the city. The neighborhood is an affluent area of the city, characterized by the presence of high-rise apartment buildings facing the Rambla and the main boulevards, together with old neoclassical and eclectic mansions.

== History ==
Gran Hotel Pocitos and the tram in the 1910s.

The neighborhood emerged as a seaside resort in the 19th century, but it was formally inaugurated in 1886, under the name of Nuestra Señora de los Pocitos. The name is due to the habit of washerwomen going to the beach to wash their clothes, for which they made wells (Spanish: Pozos) in the clean sand. Initially it was an independent town from the city, but over time it was absorbed with the urban expansion of Montevideo.

In 1906, a tram line was inaugurated that connected the Customs House in the Ciudad Vieja with Pocitos. This increased the popularity of the area, which became more accessible to the inhabitants of the downtown area of the city. In addition, the eclectic-style Gran Hotel Pocitos was built, which was a symbol of social status at the time. The building was partially destroyed due to a storm in 1923 and years later it closed permanently.

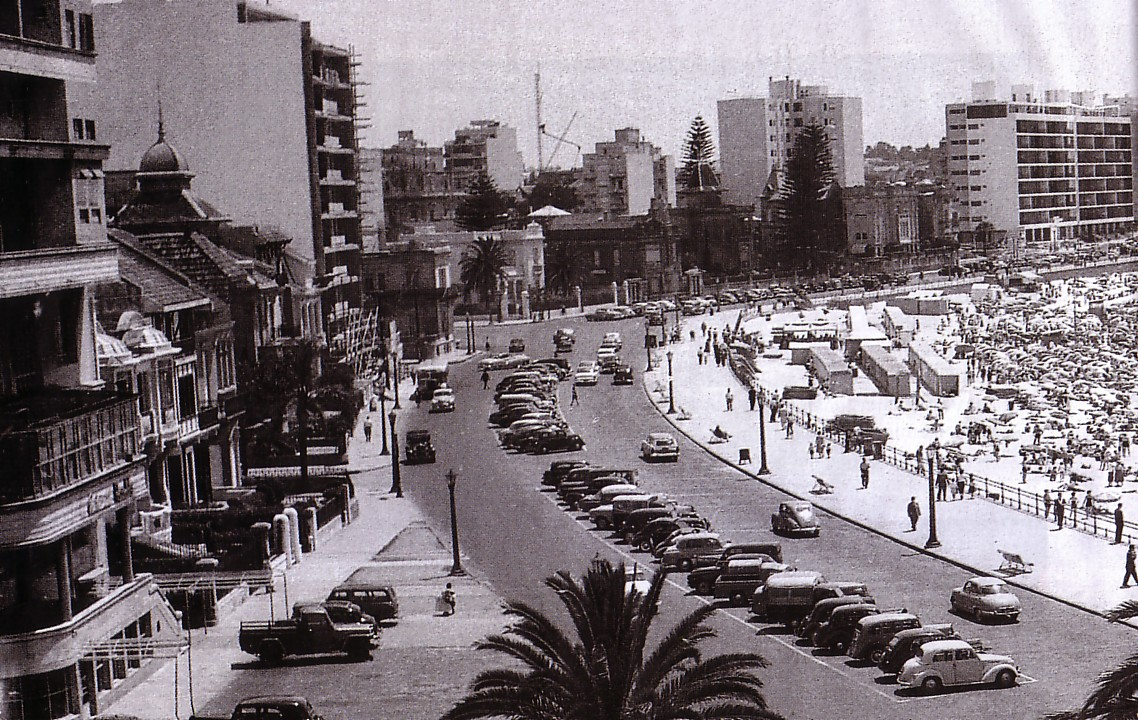
Rambla of Pocitos in 1954

In the 1920s and 1930s it became a residential area, due to the construction of a large number of private residences of European architecture. In 1921 a multipurpose stadium was built in the area, which was one of the venues of the first FIFA World Cup held in 1930, and site of the first goal in World Cup history. In the following years there was a great real estate development, and by the 1950s, Pocitos already surpassed Centro in number of apartment buildings. Architects such as Walter Pintos Risso, Luis García Pardo, Raúl Sichero Bouret, Gonzalo Vázquez Barrière and others are household names in Pocitos.

The neighborhood fell victim to even greater gentrification throughout the 1970s and 1980s as many high-rise apartment buildings for affluent residents were constructed.

Pocitos increased its population to a great extent, ranking as one of the districts with the highest population density and highest real estate prices.

== Pocitos Beach ==
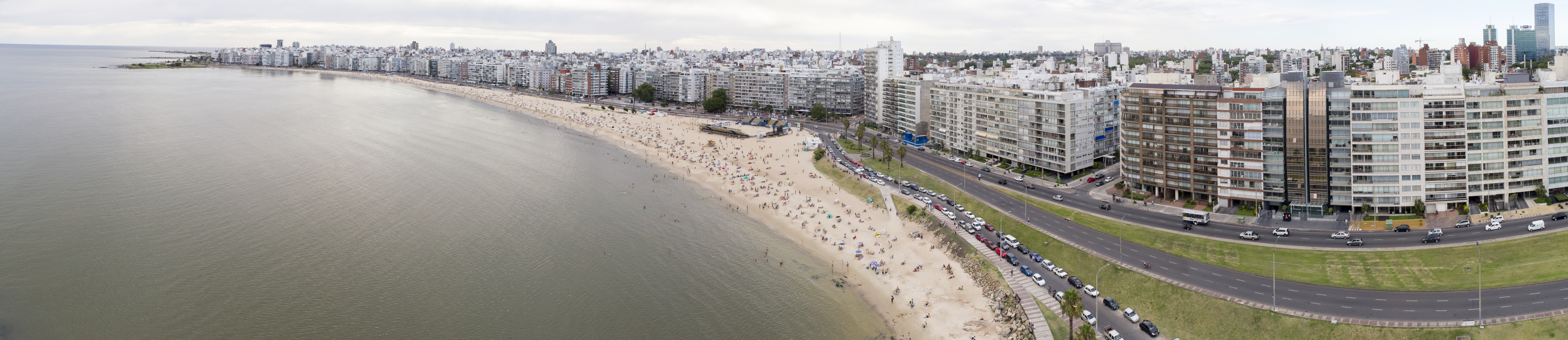
Aerial view of Pocitos Beach

Pocitos Beach is located on the coast of the Río de la Plata, an area with waters with a high level of salinity and waves. It is a very crowded beach during the summer season, as it is popular for sports. In the eastern zone stands the Arenas del Plata Stadium, a venue for beach sports for more than 2,500 spectators. The Pocitos Rambla is 2 kilometers long, and on it are yacht clubs and restaurants.

== Landmarks ==
Pocitos is connected to Central Montevideo by Spain Boulevard and Brazil Avenue. On them are located a large number of architecturally notable buildings that combine different styles, such as eclecticism and neoclassical. In turn, many embassies are located in the area, in old mansions from the late 19th century and early 20th century.

Some buildings declared National Historic Monuments by the Ministry of Education and Culture are concentrated in the district, such as the Iberian-influenced Casa de Felipe Yriart a residence designed by the architect Julio Vilamajó, the Art Nouveau Williman House, which was the residence of Claudio Williman who served as the 20th President of Uruguay, and Public School No. 17 which is called Brazil School.

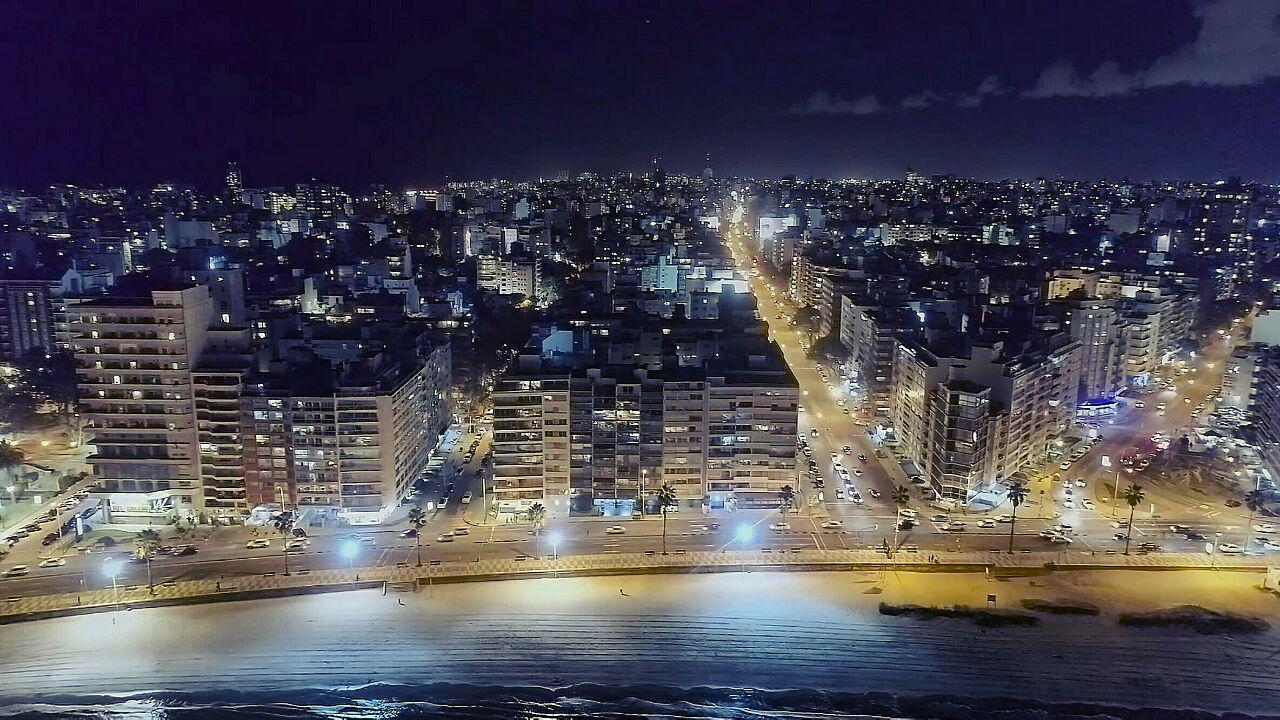
Pocitos at night

Gomensoro Square

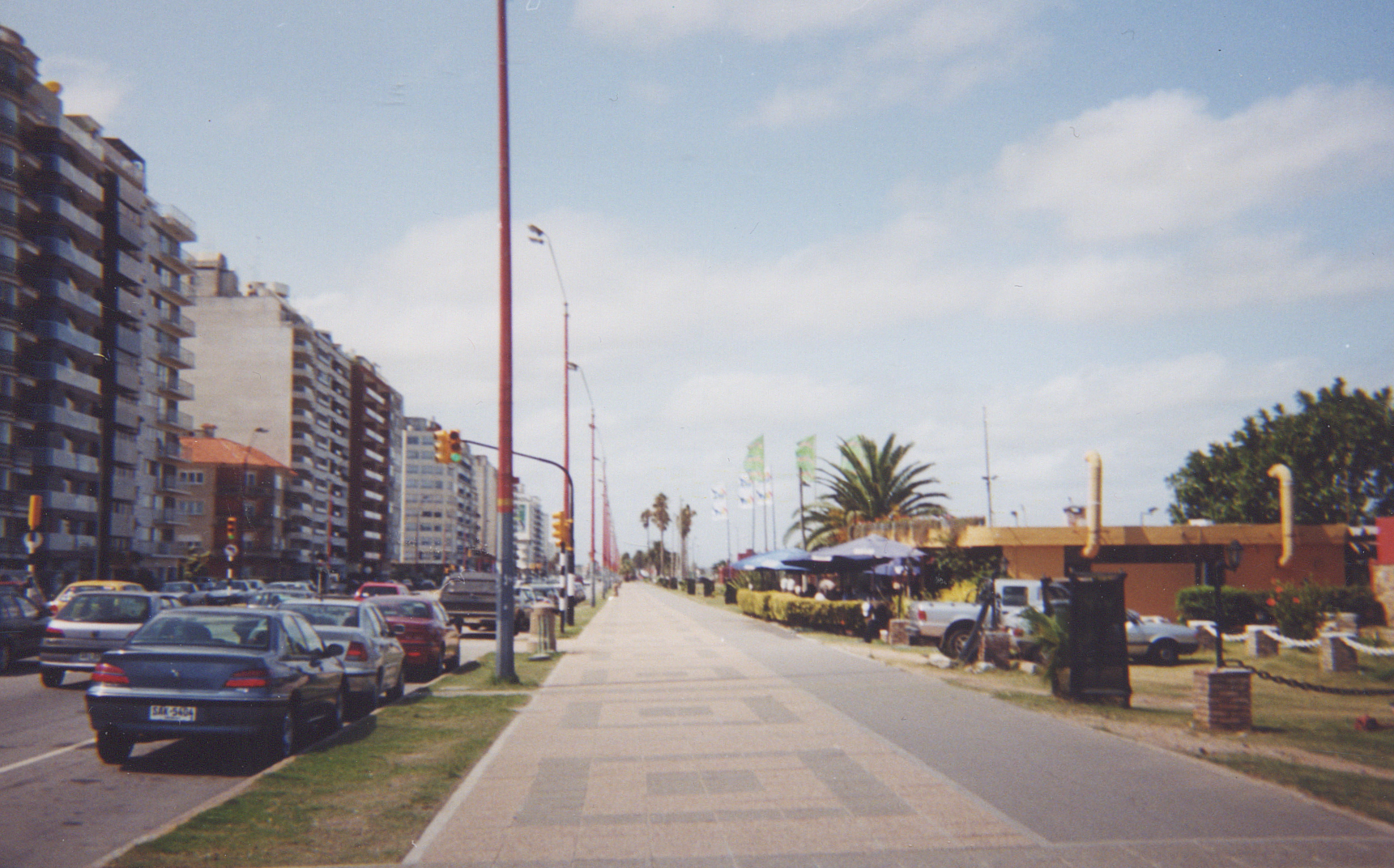
Apartment buildings and restaurants along the Rambla
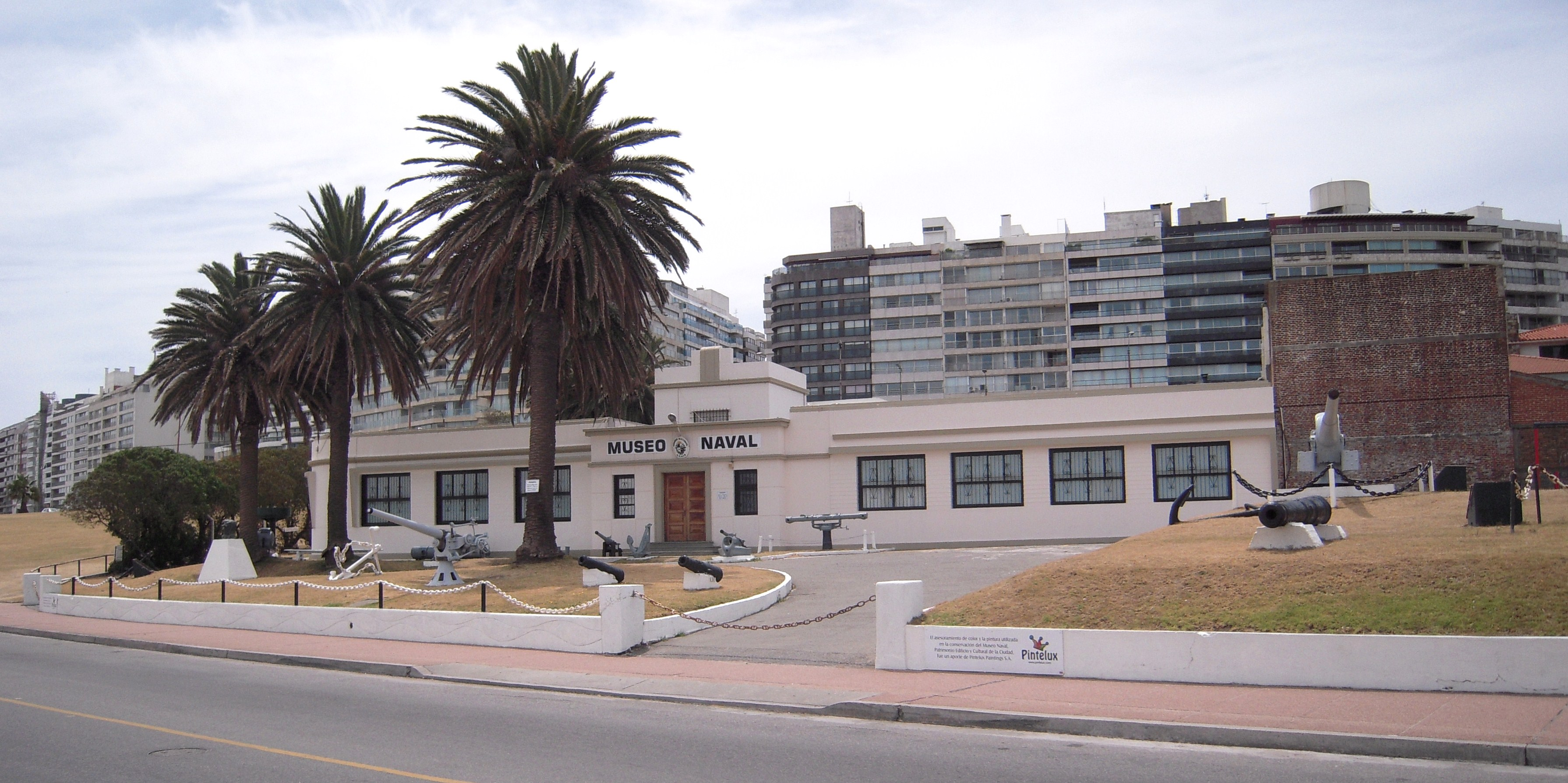
Naval Museum of Uruguay

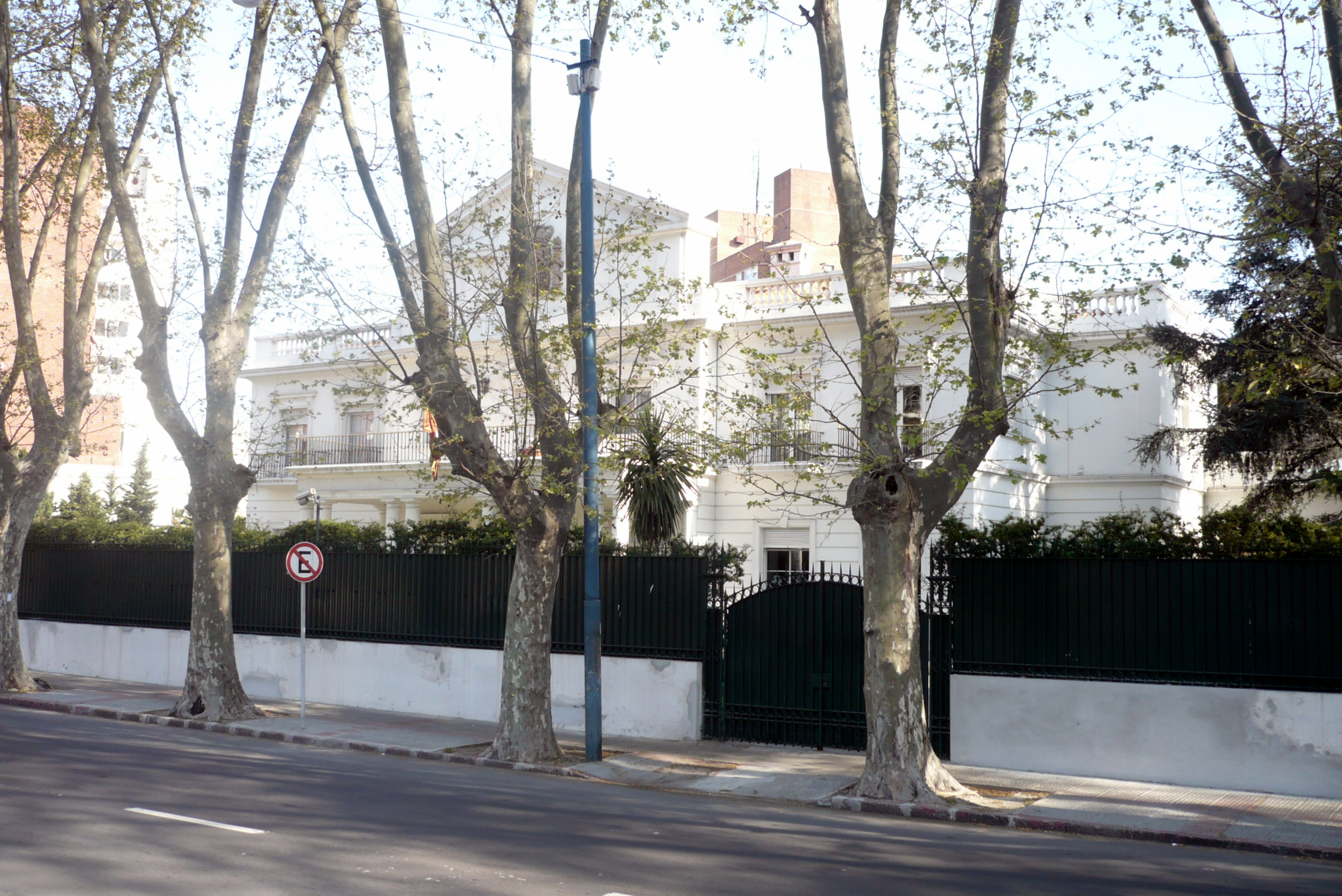
Spanish Embassy

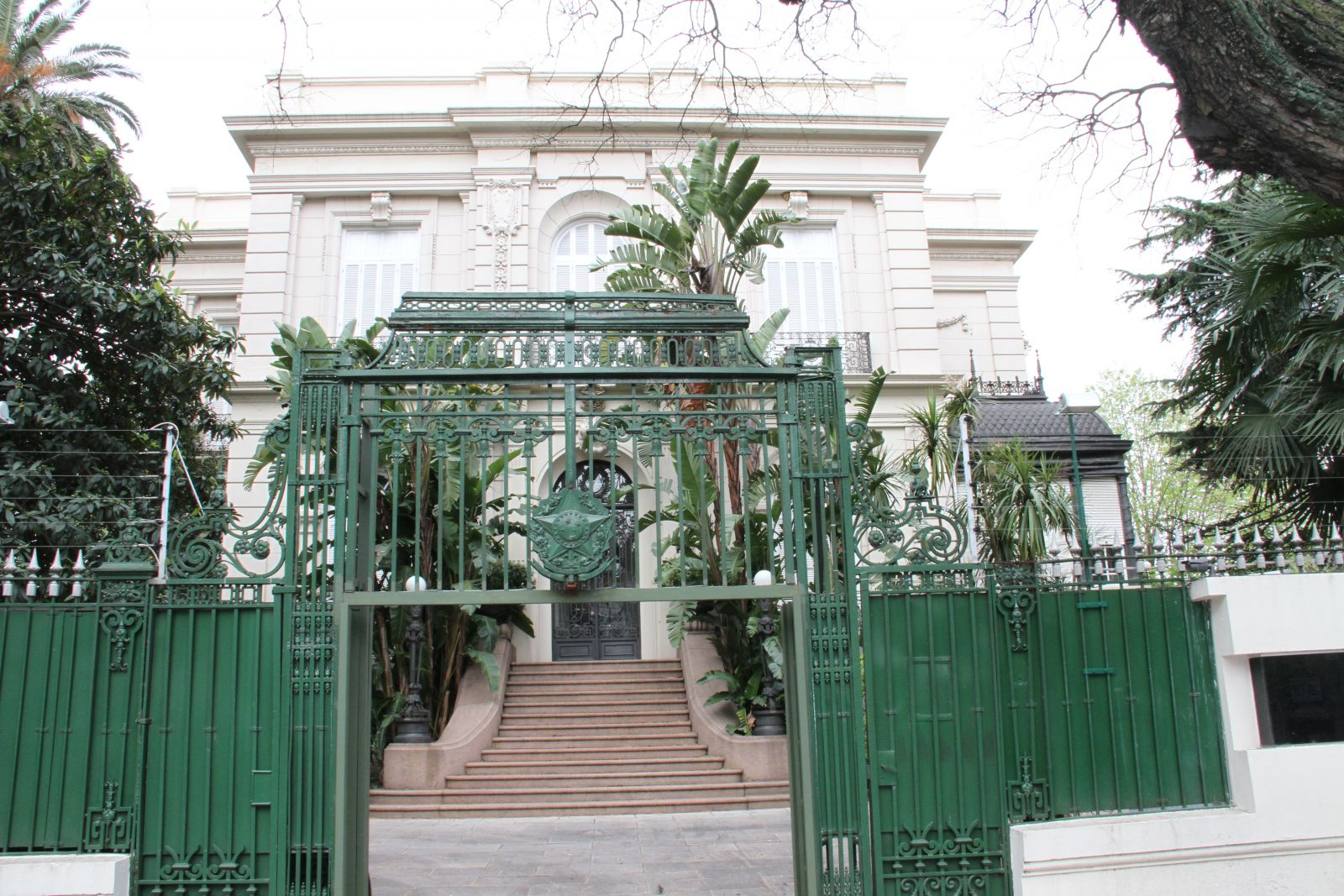
Brazilian Embassy

== Educational facilities ==
- Colegio y Liceo Nuestra Señora de Fátima (private, Roman Catholic, Claretians)
- German School of Montevideo (private, co-educational)
- Liceo Joaquin Suarez (public, co-educational)
- Yavne School (private, co-educational, Jewish)

== Places of worship ==
- Church of St. John the Baptist, popularly known as "Iglesia de Pocitos" (Roman Catholic)
- Church of Our Lady of Fatima (Roman Catholic, Claretians)
- Church of St. Alexander and St. Peter Claver (Roman Catholic)
- First Church of Christ, Scientist (Christian Science)
- Yavne (Jewish)
- Beit Jabad (Jewish-Chabad)
