= Nakam =

Jewish partisan militia

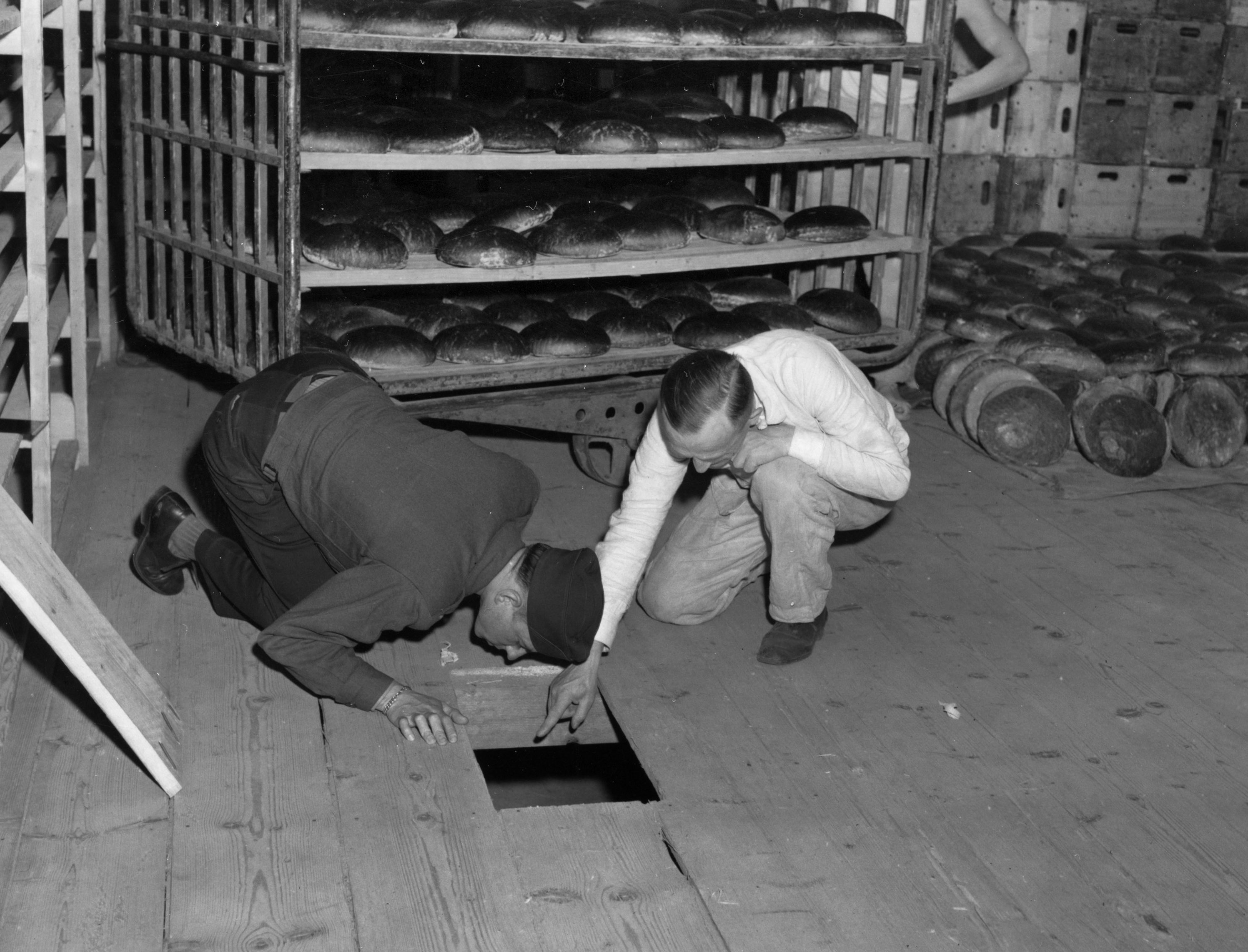
A US Army lieutenant (left) and a German detective inspecting the Konsum-Genossenschaftsbäckerei (Consumer Cooperative Bakery) in Nuremberg after a poisoning attempt

Nakam (Hebrew: נקם, 'revenge') was a paramilitary and terrorist organisation of about fifty Holocaust survivors who, after 1945, sought revenge for the murder of 6 million Jews during the Holocaust. Led by Abba Kovner, the group sought to kill six million Germans in a form of indiscriminate revenge, "a nation for a nation". Kovner went to Mandatory Palestine in order to secure large quantities of poison for poisoning water mains to kill large numbers of Germans. His followers infiltrated the water system of Nuremberg. However, Kovner was arrested upon arrival in the British zone of occupied Germany and had to throw the poison overboard.

After this failure, Nakam turned their attention to "Plan B", targeting German prisoners of war held by the United States military in the American zone. They obtained arsenic locally and infiltrated the bakeries that supplied these prison camps. The conspirators poisoned 3,000 loaves of bread at Konsum-Genossenschaftsbäckerei (Consumer Cooperative Bakery) in Nuremberg, which sickened more than 2,000 German prisoners of war at Langwasser internment camp. However, no known deaths can be attributed to the group. Although Nakam is considered to have been a terrorist organisation, German public prosecutors dismissed a case against two of its members in 2000 due to the "unusual circumstances".

== Background ==
During the Holocaust, Nazi Germany, its allies and collaborators murdered about six million Jews, by a variety of methods, including mass shootings and gassing. Many survivors, having lost their entire families and communities, had difficulty imagining a return to a normal life. The desire for revenge, either against Nazi war criminals or the entire German people, was widespread. From late 1942, as news of the Holocaust arrived in Mandatory Palestine, Jewish newspapers were full of calls for retribution. One of the leaders of the Warsaw Ghetto uprising, Yitzhak Zuckerman, later said he "didn't know a Jew who wasn't obsessed with revenge". However, very few survivors acted on these fantasies, instead focusing on rebuilding their lives and communities and commemorating those who had perished. In all, Israeli historian Dina Porat estimates that about 200 or 250 Holocaust survivors attempted to exact violent revenge, of which Nakam was a significant portion. Including assassinations carried out by Mossad, these operations claimed the lives of as many as 1,000 to 1,500 people.

== Formation ==
Jewish partisans in Vilnius after the liberation; Kovner is in the center, standing.

In 1945, Abba Kovner, after visiting the site of the Ponary massacre and the extermination camp at Majdanek, and meeting survivors of Auschwitz in Romania, decided to take revenge. He recruited about 50 Holocaust survivors, mostly former Jewish partisans, but including a few who had escaped to the Soviet Union. Recruited for their ability to live undercover and not break down, most were in their early twenties and hailed from Vilnius, Rovno, Częstochowa, or Kraków. Generally known as Nakam ("revenge"), the organisation used the Hebrew name דין (Din, "judgement"), also an acronym of דם ישראל נוטר (Dam Yisrael Noter, "the blood of Israel avenges").

The group's members believed that the defeat of Nazi Germany did not mean that Jews were safe from another Holocaust-level genocide. Kovner believed that a proportional revenge, killing six million Germans, was the only way to teach enemies of the Jews that they could not act with impunity: "The act should be shocking. The Germans should know that after Auschwitz there can be no return to normality." According to survivors, Kovner's "hypnotic" eloquence put words to the emotions that they were feeling. Members of the group believed that the laws of the time were unable to adequately punish such an extreme event as the Holocaust and that the complete moral bankruptcy of the world could be cured only by catastrophic retributive violence. Porat hypothesises that Nakam was "a necessary stage" before the embittered survivors would be prepared "to return to a life of society and laws".

The group's leaders formed two plans: Plan A, to kill a large number of Germans, and Plan B, to poison several thousand SS prisoners held in US prisoner of war camps. From Romania Kovner's group traveled to Italy, where Kovner received a warm reception from Jewish Brigade soldiers who wanted him to help organise Aliyah Bet (illegal immigration to Mandate Palestine). Kovner refused because he was already set on revenge. Nakam developed a network of underground cells and immediately set out raising money, infiltrating German infrastructure, and securing poison. The group received a large supply of German-forged British currency from a Hashomer Hatzair emissary, forced speculators to contribute, and also obtained some money from sympathisers in the Jewish Brigade.

== Plan A (planned mass poisoning in Nuremberg) ==
Joseph Harmatz, posing as a Polish displaced person (DP) named "Maim Mendele", attempted to infiltrate the municipal water supply in Nuremberg; Nakam targeted the city because it had been the stronghold of the Nazi Party. Harmatz had difficulty finding rooms for the conspirators to rent due to the housing shortage caused by the destruction of most of the city by Allied bombing. Through the use of bribes, he managed to place Willek Schwerzreich (Wilek Shinar), an engineer from Kraków who spoke fluent German, in a position with the municipal water company. Schwarzreich obtained the plan of the water system and control of the main water valve, and plotted where the poison should be introduced so as to kill the largest possible number of Germans. In Paris, Pasha Reichman was in charge of a Nakam cell including Vitka Kempner, Kovner's future wife and former comrade in the Vilna Ghetto underground. Reichman reportedly spoke to David Ben-Gurion during the latter's trip to a DP camp in Germany, but the latter preferred to work towards Israeli independence than seek revenge for the Holocaust.

It fell to Kovner to obtain the poison from leaders in the Yishuv, the Jewish leadership in Mandatory Palestine. In July 1945, Kovner left the Jewish Brigade for Milan, disguising himself as a Jewish Brigade soldier on leave, and boarded a ship for Palestine the following month. Reichman became leader in Europe in his absence. Upon reaching Palestine, Kovner was held for three days in an apartment by the Mossad LeAliyah Bet and was personally interrogated by Mossad chief Shaul Meirov. Kovner negotiated with Haganah chiefs Moshe Sneh and Israel Galilee in hopes of convincing them to give him poison for a smaller revenge operation in return for not linking the murder to the Yishuv.

In September, Kovner informed Nakam in Europe that he had not had any success in locating poison, and therefore they should recruit Yitzhak Ratner, a chemist and former Vilna Ghetto insurgent, and focus on Plan B. Kovner was eventually introduced to Ephraim and Aharon Katzir, chemists at the Hebrew University of Jerusalem, via one of their students who was a member of the Haganah. The Katzir brothers were sympathetic to Kovner's revenge plot and convinced the head of chemical storage at the Hebrew University to give him poison. Decades after the fact, Kovner claimed that he had pitched Plan B to Chaim Weizmann, then president of the World Zionist Organisation, who had directed him to the Katzir brothers. However, according to his biographer, if Kovner met Weizmann at all it was in February or March 1946, as Weizmann was out of the country before that.

After several delays, Kovner travelled to Alexandria, Egypt, in December 1945 carrying false papers that identified him as a Jewish Brigade soldier returning from leave, and a duffel bag with gold hidden in toothpaste tubes and cans full of poison. Shortly after boarding a ship headed to Toulon, France, Kovner's name along with three others was called over the public address system. Kovner told a friend, Yitzik Rosenkranz, to convey the duffel bag to Kempner in Paris, and then threw half the poison overboard. After this, he turned himself in and was arrested by Egyptian police. Nakam members later claimed that Kovner had been betrayed by the Haganah, but Porat writes that it is more likely that he was arrested as a suspected organiser of Aliyah Bet. Kovner, who spoke no English and had not attended the Jewish Brigade training, was not questioned about Nakam; after two months in jails in Egypt and Palestine, he was released. His involvement in Nakam ended at that time.

== Plan B (mass poisoning of SS prisoners) ==
Because Kovner had not managed to secure the quantity of poison required, the Nuremberg cell decided to switch to poisoning SS prisoners definitively during the first months of 1946. Most of the Nakam action groups disbanded as ordered and their members dispersed into displaced persons camps, promised by the leaders that in future they would be reactivated to implement Plan A. The cells in Nuremberg and Dachau remained active because of the large US prisoner of war camps nearby. Yitzhak Ratner was recruited into the group to obtain poison locally. In October 1945, he set up a laboratory in the Nakam headquarters in Paris, where he tested various formulations in order to find a tasteless, odorless poison that would have delayed effects. Ratner eventually formulated a mixture of arsenic, glue, and other additives which could be painted onto loaves of bread; tests on cats proved the lethality of the mixture. He obtained more than 18 kilograms (40 lb) of arsenic from friends who worked in the tanning industry, which was smuggled into Germany.

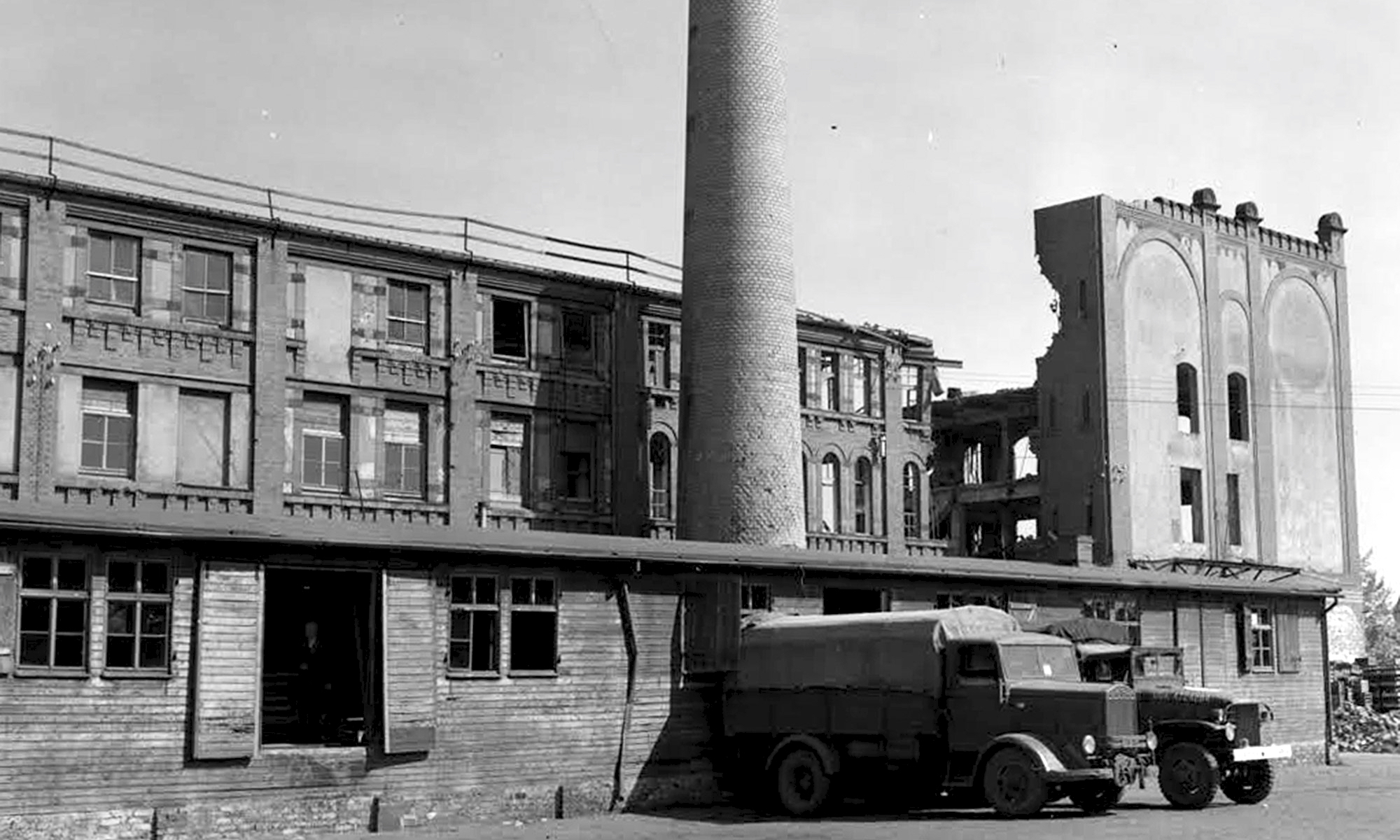
The Konsum-Genossenschaftsbäckerei (Consumer Cooperative Bakery) in Nuremberg

Nakam focused on Langwasser internment camp near Nuremberg (formerly Stalag XIII-D), where 12,000 to 15,000 prisoners, mainly former SS officers or prominent Nazis, were imprisoned by the United States. Initially, two Nakam members were hired by the camp, one as a driver, another as a storehouse worker. The bread for Langwasser came from a single bakery in Nuremberg, the Konsum-Genossenschaftsbäckerei (Consumer Cooperative Bakery). Leipke Distel, a survivor of several Nazi concentration camps, posed as a Polish displaced person awaiting a visa to work at an uncle's bakery in Canada. He asked the manager if he could work for free and eventually secured access to the bakery storeroom after bribing him with cigarettes, alcohol, and chocolate. The Nakam operatives met each night in a rented room in Fürth to discuss their findings, especially how to confine their attack to the German prisoners and avoid harming the American guards. When Harmatz placed a few of the workers in clerical positions in the camp, they discovered that on Sundays, the black bread would be eaten only by the German prisoners because the American guards were specially issued white bread. Therefore, they decided to execute the attack on a Saturday night.

Similar preparations were made with regard to a prison camp near Dachau and the bakery supplying it, an effort led by Warsaw Ghetto uprising veteran Simcha Rotem. After becoming friends with Poles who worked in the bakery, Rotem got the manager drunk, made copies of his keys, and then returned them before he sobered up. A few days before the planned attack, Reichman received a tip-off from a Jewish intelligence officer in the United States Army that two of the operatives were wanted by the police. As ordered, the Dachau Nakam operatives aborted on 11 April 1946. Reichman feared that the failure of one attack would cause the United States to increase its security measures at prison camps, preventing a second attack.

By this time, six Nakam members worked at the Konsum-Genossenschaftsbäckerei in Nuremberg. Subverting tight security aimed at preventing the theft of food, they smuggled the arsenic in over several days, hiding it under raincoats, and stashed it beneath the floorboards. Because experiments had shown that the arsenic mixture did not spread evenly, the operatives decided to paint it onto the bottom of each loaf. On Saturday 13 April, the bakery workers were on strike, delaying the Nakam operatives and preventing three of them from entering the bakery. As a result, Distel and his two accomplices had only enough time to poison some 3,000 loaves of bread instead of 14,000 as originally planned. After painting the loaves, they fled to Czechoslovakia, helped by an Auschwitz survivor named Yehuda Maimon, continuing on through Italy to southern France.

On 23 April 1946, The New York Times reported that 2,283 German prisoners of war had fallen ill from poisoning, with 207 hospitalized and seriously ill. However, the operation ultimately caused no known deaths. According to documents obtained by a Freedom of Information request to the National Archives and Records Administration, the amount of arsenic found in the bakery was enough to kill approximately 60,000 persons. It is unknown why the poisoners failed, but it is suspected to be either that they spread the poison too thinly, or else that the prisoners realised that the bread had been poisoned and did not eat very much.

== Aftermath and legacy ==
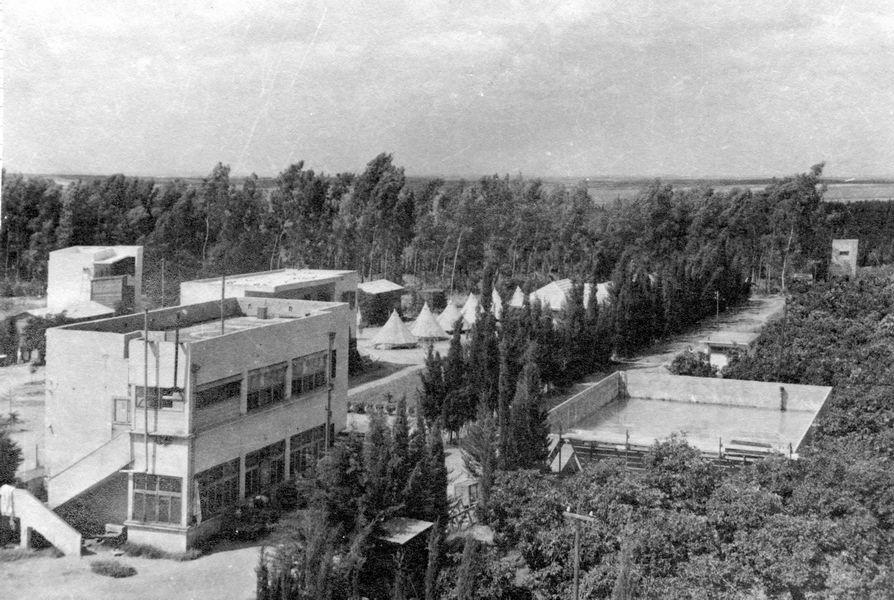
Kibbutz Ein HaHoresh in 1940

About 30 former Nakam operatives boarded the ship Biriya on 23 June 1946 and arrived by the end of July following brief detention by the British authorities. They received a warm welcome at Kovner's kibbutz, Ein HaHoresh, from leading members of the Haganah and the Israeli Labor Party, and were invited to travel through the country. Although Kovner, and the majority of the operatives, considered that the time for revenge had passed, a small group led by Bolek Ben-Ya'akov returned to Europe to continue the mission. Nine other Nakam operatives broke away in the spring of 1947 and returned to Europe the following year, helped by Labor Party politician Abba Hushi.

The breakaway groups faced mounting challenges, both logistical and financial, and the foundation of the Federal Republic of Germany in 1949 made illegal operations even more difficult. Many of the members turned to a life of crime to support themselves, and then tried to escape from German jails with the help of former French Resistance members. Most returned to Israel between 1950 and 1952. Ben-Ya'akov said in an interview that he "could not have looked at himself in the mirror" if he had not tried to get revenge, and that he still deeply regretted that it did not succeed. After coming to Israel, former Nakam members refused to speak about their experiences for several decades, beginning to discuss the issue only in the 1980s. Porat writes that Kovner "committed political suicide" by participating in Nakam; she describes its failure as a "miracle." Members of the group showed no remorse, said that the Germans "deserved it," and wanted recognition, rather than forgiveness, for their actions.

In 1999, Harmatz and Distel appeared in a documentary and discussed their role in Nakam. Distel maintained that Nakam's actions were moral and that the Jews "had a right to revenge against the Germans." German prosecutors opened an investigation against them for attempted murder, but halted the preliminary investigation in 2000 because of the "unusual circumstances." As of November 2019, four members of the group are reported to still be alive.

== Historiography and popular culture ==
An early journalistic account of Nakam's mission is in Michael Bar-Zohar's 1969 book The Avengers. The story was given a fictionalised treatment in Forged in Fury by Michael Elkins in 1971. Jonathan Freedland's novel The Final Reckoning is based on the story. The story of Nakam has also entered German popular culture. In 2009, Daniel Kahn & the Painted Bird, a Germany-based klezmer band, recorded a song called "Six Million Germans (Nakam)". Based on tapes Kovner made on his deathbed describing his activities in Nakam, a television documentary was produced by Channel 4 for its Secret History series titled Holocaust – The Revenge Plot, which was first broadcast on Holocaust Memorial Day, 27 January 2018.

According to Israeli counterterrorism experts Ehud Sprinzak and Idith Zertal, Nakam's worldview was similar to messianic groups or cults because of its belief that the world was so evil as to deserve large-scale catastrophe. The Nakam operatives came from "heavily brutalized communities" which, according to Sprinzak and Zertal, sometimes consider catastrophic violence.

Dina Porat is the first academic historian to systematically study the group, meeting with many of the survivors and gaining access to their private documents. She hypothesises that the failure of the attack may have been deliberate, as Kovner and other leaders began to realise that it could have greatly harmed the Jewish people. She struggled to reconcile the personalities of Nakam's members with the actions that they tried to carry out. When asked how he could plan an attack in which many innocent people would have been killed, one survivor explained that "[i]f you had been there with me, at the end of the war, you wouldn't talk that way". Porat's 2019 book on Nakam is titled Vengeance and Retribution Are Mine (לי נקם ושילם), a phrase from Deuteronomy which expresses her belief that the Jewish people are best to leave vengeance in the hands of the God of Israel.

In 2021, the film Plan A, directed and produced by Doron Paz and Yoav Paz, adapted the plot for cinema.

== See also ==
- Daniel Kahn & the Painted Bird
- Herberts Cukurs
- Tilhas Tizig Gesheften
- Gmul

== Bibliography ==
- Khan, A. S.; Swerdlow, D. L.; Juranek, D. D. (2001). "Precautions against biological and chemical terrorism directed at food and water supplies". Public Health Reports. 116 (1): 3–14. doi:10.1016/s0033-3549(04)50017-1. ISSN 0033-3549. PMC 1497290. PMID 11571403.
- Fritz, Stephen (2004). Endkampf: Soldiers, Civilians, and the Death of the Third Reich. Lexington: University Press of Kentucky. ISBN 9780813171906.
- Gay, Ruth (2008). Safe Among the Germans: Liberated Jews After World War II. New Haven: Yale University Press. ISBN 9780300133127.
- Lang, Berel (1996). "Holocaust Memory and Revenge: The Presence of the Past". Jewish Social Studies. 2 (2): 1–20. JSTOR 4467468.
- Melnick, Alan (2007). Biological, Chemical, and Radiological Terrorism: Emergency Preparedness and Response for the Primary Care Physician. Berlin: Springer Science & Business Media. ISBN 9780387472324.
- Porat, Dina (2009) [2000]. The Fall of a Sparrow: The Life and Times of Abba Kovner. Palo Alto: Stanford University Press. ISBN 9780804772525.
- Segev, Tom (2000) [1991]. The Seventh Million: The Israelis and the Holocaust. London: Macmillan. ISBN 978-0-8050-6660-9.
- Sprinzak, Ehud; Zertal, Idith (2000). "Avenging Israeli's Blood (1946)". In Tucker, Jonathan B. (ed.). Toxic Terror: Assessing Terrorist Use of Chemical and Biological Weapons. Cambridge, Massachusetts: MIT Press. ISBN 978-0-262-20128-5.
- Stier, Oren Baruch (2016). "Six Million: The Numerical Icon of the Holocaust". In Kravel-Tovi, Michal; Moore, Deborah Dash (eds.). Taking Stock: Cultures of Enumeration in Contemporary Jewish Life. Bloomington: Indiana University Press. pp. 29–46. ISBN 9780253020574.
- Waligorska, Magdalena (2013). Klezmer's Afterlife: An Ethnography of the Jewish Music Revival in Poland and Germany. Oxford: Oxford University Press. ISBN 9780199995790.
- Waligorska, Magdalena (2014). ""Darkness at the beginning": the Holocaust in contemporary German crime fiction". In Kutch, Lynn M.; Herzog, Todd (eds.). Tatort Germany: The Curious Case of German-language Crime Fiction. Woodbridge: Boydell & Brewer. ISBN 9781571135711.
