= Nicholas Jacob =

Israeli actor

- ניקולאס יעקוב
- Born: 1988/1989 (age 37–38); Haifa, Israel
- Occupation: Actor
- Years active: 2012–present

Nicholas Jacob (Hebrew: ניקולאס יעקוב; born 1988/1989) is an Israeli actor. He was born in Haifa to an Arab-Israeli father and an Italian mother. He is best known for playing Nimr in the 2012 film Out in the Dark.
