= 25 Watts =

2001 film by Juan Pablo Rebella and Pablo Stoll

- Theatrical release poster
- Directed by: Juan Pablo Rebella; Pablo Stoll
- Written by: Juan Pablo Rebella; Pablo Stoll
- Produced by: Fernando Epstein
- Starring: Daniel Hendler; Jorge Temponi; Alfonso Tort
- Cinematography: Bárbara Álvarez
- Edited by: Fernando Epstein
- Distributed by: Cinema Tropical
- Release date: 10 June 2001 (Uruguay)
- Running time: 92-94 minutes
- Country: Uruguay
- Language: Spanish
- Budget: $12,000

25 Watts is a 2001 Uruguayan urban comedy drama film directed and written by the partnership of Juan Pablo Rebella and Pablo Stoll. The independent film picture stars Daniel Hendler, Jorge Temponi, and Alfonso Tort, as it revolves around three teenagers and their struggles in a sleazy neighborhood of Montevideo on a summer Saturday. The film received a total of ten awards and three additional nominations, including Best Feature Film Award at the Rotterdam International Film Festival, Best First Feature Film Award at the Havana Film Festival.

== Plot ==
The film follows 24 hours in the lives of three teenage boys—Leche (Alejandro), Javi, and Seba—in Montevideo. As they drift through a typical Saturday, they face the struggles of youth: school pressures, romantic confusion, and the aimlessness of early adulthood. The film also comes across several unique characters, including a mentally ill delivery boy, a drug addict, and a philosophical counter clerk at a video rental store.

In the film’s opening sequence, Leche, whose parents have left for the weekend and is stuck with his ill grandmother, accidentally steps in dog waste and becomes convinced that he's cursed with bad luck. As he tries to prepare for an upcoming Italian exam, he struggles to stay focused—repeating the same phrases aimlessly, getting distracted by music, and even developing sexual fantasies with his tutor, Beatriz. In addition, Leche also tries to help Gerardito, a mentally challenged friend, to find his missing dog, Ulises.

Javi has landed a job driving a sound truck that blasts the same pasta commercial on repeat all day. Though he finished secondary school, he never pursued college, and now faces constant pressure from his boss, Don Héctor, to get his act together and aim higher in life. As he finishes his shift later in the day, he meets up with his girlfriend, in which they fight over Javi feeding his pet hamster dog food and over her cassette tape.

Seba is waylaid by a handful of small-time dope dealers after recognizing he is the younger brother of their friend, Marmota, when all he wants to do is go home and watch the porno movie he rented.

== Cast ==
- Daniel Hendler as Leche
- Jorge Temponi as Javi
- Alfonso Tort as Seba
- Valentín Rivero as Hernán, a blond friend
- Walter Reyno as Don Héctor, Javi's boss
- Damián Barrera as Joselo, Héctor's son
- César Herrera as Neighbor in elevator
- Judith Anaya as Leche's grandmother
- Federico Veiroj as Gerardito
- Valeria Mendieta as María
- Silvio Sielsky as Pitufo, the Guinness records freak
- Claudio Martínez as Kiwi, young man with ball
- Teresita González as Neighbor with chair
- Roberto Suárez as Gepetto, the pizza man
- Gonzalo Eyherabide as Sandía, the video club owner
- Robert Moré as Rulo, a junkie
- Carolina Presno as Beatriz
- Nacho Mendy as Chopo, Rulo's friend
- Leo Trincabelli as Menchaca, Rulo's friend
- Luis Villasante as Waiter
- Marcelo Ramón as Bouncer
- Daniel Mella as Lalo, Beatriz' boyfriend

== Exhibition ==
The film first previewed at the Rotterdam International Film Festival in the Netherlands on January 28, 2001 but was not released fully in Uruguay until June 1. The picture was screened at various film festivals, including: the Karlovy Vary Film Festival, Czech Republic; the Helsinki International Film Festival, Finland; the Warsaw Film Festival, Poland; the Medellín de Película, Colombia; the Latin America Film Festival, Poland; and others.

== Critical reception ==
The film was met with mixed reviews. Mark Peranson, a writer for IndieWire, praised Rebella and Stoll for their emotionally honest filmmaking that avoids ironic detachment and offering a more "realistic" perspective of the Montevideo youth. Jonathan Rosenbaum from the Chicago Reader called it "very charming and funny derivation." Deborah Young, a film critic for Variety magazine and reporting from the Rotterdam Film Festival, gave the film a mixed review and wrote, "A rare offering from Uruguay, 25 Watts dully portrays the dim lives of three teenage boys in a sleepy Montevideo neighborhood. With no story to tell, tyro co-directors Juan Pablo Rebella and Pablo Stoll place far too much faith in hang-dog, Jim Jarmusch-style humor, emphasized by repetitious dialog, flat B&W lensing, and limited sets. Pic—which won one of the three Tiger Awards and the Youth Jury Prize at Rotterdam—lacks the spark of inspiration that would make this formula work, and most viewers are likely to run for cover well before the end."

== Awards ==
Wins

- Uruguayan Film Critics Association: UFCA Award, Best Uruguayan Film; 2001.
- Bogotá Film Festival: Honorable Mention, Juan Pablo Rebella; For focusing on the daily problems of today's youth; 2001.
- Buenos Aires International Festival of Independent Cinema: Best Actor, Daniel Hendler, Jorge Temponi and Alfonso Tort; FIPRESCI Prize, Juan Pablo Rebella, Pablo Stoll; For injecting humor, visual energy and delightful dialogue into the 'Slacker' movie formula; 2001.
- Cinema Jove - Valencia International Film Festival, Spain: Audience Award, Feature Film, Pablo Stoll and Juan Pablo Rebella; Special Mention, Feature Film, Pablo Stoll and Juan Pablo Rebella; 2001.
- Havana Film Festival: Coral, Best First Work, Pablo Stoll and Juan Pablo Rebella; 2001.
- Lima Latin American Film Festival: Best Screenplay, Juan Pablo Rebella and Pablo Stoll; 2001.
- Rotterdam International Film Festival: MovieZone Award, Juan Pablo Rebella and Pablo Stoll; Tiger Award, Juan Pablo Rebella and Pablo Stoll; 2001.

Nominations

- Bogotá Film Festival: Golden Precolumbian Circle, Best Film, Juan Pablo Rebella, Pablo Stoll; 2001.
- Buenos Aires International Festival of Independent Cinema: Best Film, Juan Pablo Rebella and Pablo Stoll; 2001.
- Gramado Film Festival, Brazil: Golden Kikito, Latin Film Competition - Best Film, Juan Pablo Rebella and Pablo Stoll; 2001.
