= Michael Aloni =

Israeli actor (born 1984)

- מיכאל אלוני
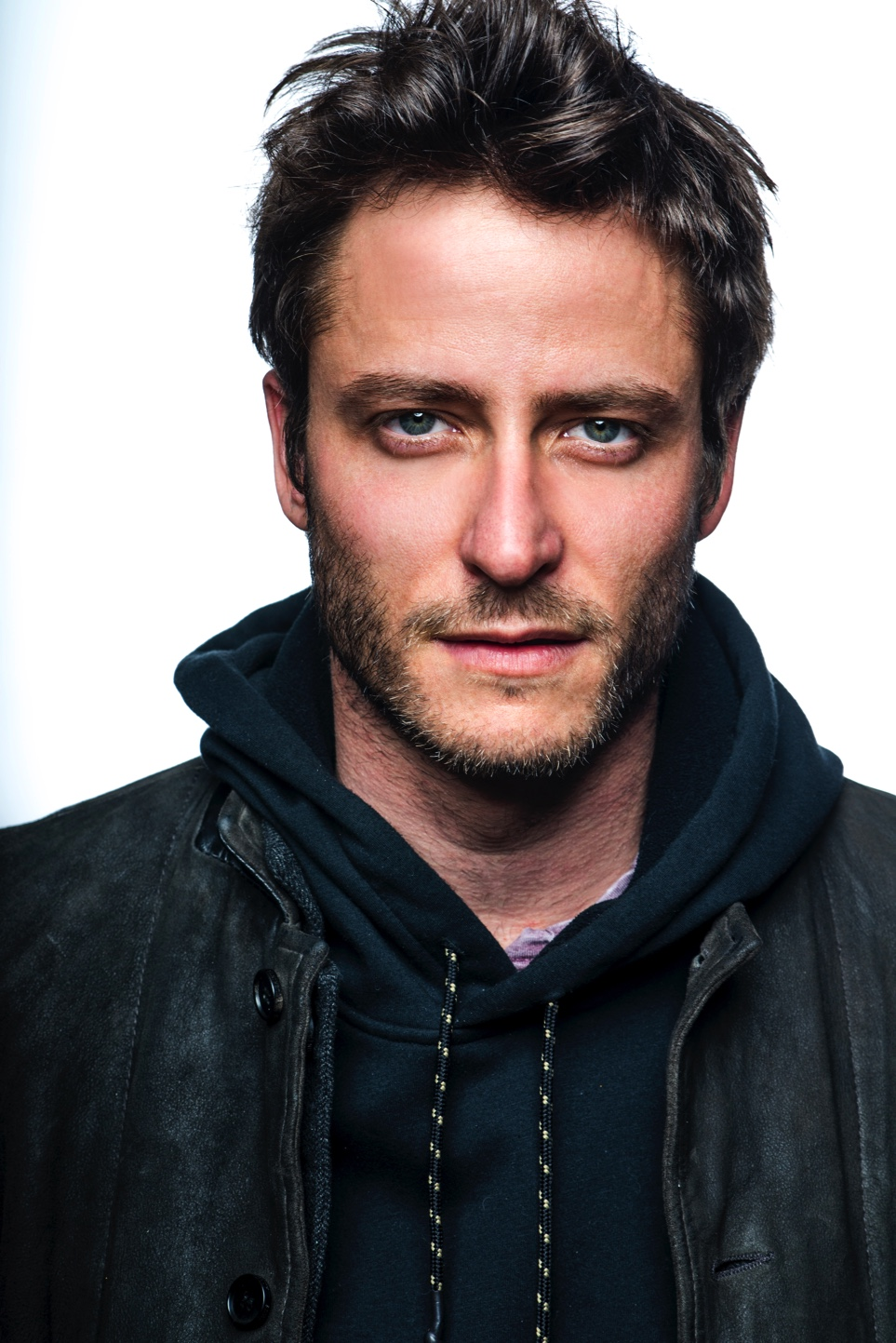
- Born: 31 January 1984 (age 42); Tel Aviv, Israel
- Occupations: Actor, director, writer, television presenter
- Years active: 2005–present

Michael Mark Aloni (or Alony; Hebrew: מיכאל אלוני; born 31 January 1984) is an Israeli actor, director, writer and television presenter. Regarded as one of the best performers of his generation in Israel, he is recognized for his versatile work across independent films, television and the stage.

A graduate of Nissan Nativ Action Studio, he had a breakout role on the hit teen TV drama, HaShminiya (2005–2007). He also appeared in the films, Policeman (2011) and Out in the Dark (2012). He became known to international audiences when Netflix picked up international streaming rights for the critically acclaimed TV series, Shtisel (2013–2021). Aloni portrayed the protagonist, Akiva Shtisel, a Haredi man in the Geula neighborhood in Jerusalem.

He also appeared in other prominent TV productions such as When Heroes Fly (2018), Our Boys (2019), and Scenes from a Marriage (2021). Most recently, he has had a leading role in The Beauty Queen of Jerusalem (2021–2023) and a supporting role in the Holocaust family drama series, We Were The Lucky Ones (2024) on Hulu.

== Early life ==
Aloni was born in Tel Aviv to secular Jewish parents; his mother was originally from Poland. He had a Bar Mitzvah at age 13. His mother is an attorney and his father is an accountant. During his military service in the Israel Defense Forces, he served as a Gadna commander in the Marva training program of the Education Corps.

He studied acting at the Nissan Nativ Acting Studio between 2006 and 2009. He also appeared in a number of advertising campaigns as a male model.

== Career ==
=== Film and television ===
Aloni had a breakout role as Adam Halevi for three seasons on the hit teen drama, HaShminiya (2005–2007). He became a household name in Israel during his time on the show. He has since described this as his favorite role: "There's something primal about your first role that stays with you."

In 2012, he starred in the critically acclaimed LGBT film, Out in the Dark. He portrayed Roy, an Israeli Jewish lawyer in Tel Aviv who begins a relationship with a Palestinian man from the West Bank. The American film critic Rex Reed praised the film in The New York Observer: "It's one of the most powerful films about the Arab-Israeli conflict that has ever been attempted on the screen." Reed commended Aloni's "outstanding" performance.

In 2013, he was cast as Akiva Shtisel, a young Haredi man, in the yes family drama series, Shtisel (2013–2021). Already a hit show in Israel, it also became popular with international audiences when Netflix began streaming the series in 2018. He spent three months preparing for the role: “I spent Shabbos with a Haredi family, and we needed to learn Yiddish and a different kind of Hebrew, loshen hakodesh, from the one we speak day-to-day. We learned prayers and the rules of Jewish law. We had to learn everything from scratch. I loved it.”

He also starred in the Keshet series, When Heroes Fly (2017), alongside Tomer Capone. In April 2018, it won the best series at Canneseries.

In 2021, he appeared alongside Jessica Chastain and Oscar Isaac in the HBO miniseries, Scenes from a Marriage. It is an English-language remake of the 1973 Swedish miniseries of the same name by Ingmar Bergman.

He was cast as Gabriel Ermosa in The Beauty Queen of Jerusalem (2021–2023). The series is set during Ottoman rule and subsequently under the British Mandate for Palestine. Aloni played the son of a prosperous merchant Sephardi family. He fell in love with an Ashkenazi woman, but is pressured by his family into marrying a Sephardi woman.

In 2024, he appeared in the Hulu limited series, We Were the Lucky Ones, based on a book of the same name by Georgia Hunter. It tells the true life story of the Kurc family in Poland who survived the Holocaust. Aloni plays Selim, a doctor and the husband of Mila (Hadas Yaron). Aloni previously played Yaron's on-screen husband when the pair portrayed the roles of Akiva and Libbi Shtisel in Shtisel.

He also starred in One Day in October, an anthology drama television series based on the personal stories from the October 7 attacks in 2023. The series premiered on Israel's Yes Drama in Israel on October 7, 2024. It will be released on October 7, 2025 in the United States through HBO Max.

In 2025, he starred in the Buenos Aires-set series, AMIA on Channel 13, based on the AMIA bombing in 1994.

=== Stage ===
In 2014, Aloni starred in Edna Mazia's comic satire, The New Criminals at Cameri Theatre in Tel Aviv. Aloni plays Ilai, the grown-up son of the family and an aspiring musician.

In 2018, Aloni starred in Martin Sherman's play, Bent at Habima Theatre in Tel Aviv. The play explores the persecution of homosexuals during the Holocaust.

In 2024, Aloni took on the role of Zaza (previously occupied by Lior Ashkenazi) in a stage adaptation of Dover Kosashvili 2021 film, Late Marriage at Habima Theatre.

In 2024, from September to October, Aloni starred in David Edgar's play Here in America at the Orange Tree Theatre in London. Aloni was directed by James Dacre in the 1950s set play that imagines a confrontation between Arthur Miller (Aloni) and Elia Kazan. Aloni was praised by The Guardian's theatre critic: "Aloni, making his UK stage debut, is strong as the upstanding art."

=== Additional work ===
As a television presenter, he hosted five seasons of the singing competition, The Voice Israel on Channel 2 (2012–2017) and Channel 13 (2018–2019).

In 2017, his debut novel, Love in the Days of Flu, was published by Steimatzky. It consists of four novellas and two short stories. Aloni wrote one of the stories when he was 16 years old.

In 2017, he also directed a short film, Shir (Song), about a teenage girl that skips school on Israel's memorial day, Yom HaZikaron.

== Filmography ==
Year	Title	Role	Notes
2005–2007	HaShminiya	Adam Halevi	Series regular
2006	Out of Sight	Tomer the Lifeguard	Original title: Lemarit Ain
2006	Ha-Alufa	Eddy Franco	2 episodes
2009	Ruin	Ben	
2010	Infiltration	Benny	Original title: Hitganvut Yehidim
2011	Policeman	Nathanael	Original title: Ha-shoter
2012	Keshet Beanan		Short
2012	Out in the Dark	Roy Schaffer	
2013	A Place in Heaven	Frenchie	Original title: Makom beGan Eden
2013–2016, 2020	Shtisel	Akiva Shtisel	Series regular
2014	Keep it Cool	Uri	Short
2014	Shovrei Galim	Noam	2 episodes
2016	Antenna		
2016	Lucid		Short
2017	Naor's Friends	Raz Hita	Episode #4.10
2017	Metim LeRega	Lev Alexander	Episode #2.1
2017	And Then She Arrived	Dan	Original title: VeAz Hi Hegiaa
2018	Virgins	Tchipi	Nomination - Ophir Award for Best Supporting Actor
2018	When Heroes Fly	Dotan 'Himler' Friedman	Series regular
2019	Happy Times	Michael	
2019	Our Boys	Itzik	
2019–2020	Greenhouse Academy	The Client/Jason Osmond (alter ego version)	Seasons 3 & 4
2021	Scenes from a Marriage	Poli	Episode: "In the Middle of the Night, in a Dark House, Somewhere in the World"
2021	Plan A	Michael	
2021-2022	The Beauty Queen of Jerusalem	Gabriel	
2023	The Stronghold	Dr. Nahum Werbin	
2023	The Stronghold	Dr. Nahum Webin	5-episode expanded TV series of original film
2024	Plan A	Michael	
2025	AMIA	Diego	Series
2025	One Day in October	Ariel Golan-Hogeg	Episode: "Home"
2027	Save the Date		Season 2; main cast

== Stage ==
Year	Title	Role	Venue	Ref.
2014	The New Criminals	Ilai	Cameri Theatre	
2018	Bent	Max	Habima Theatre	
2024	Late Marriage	Zaza	Habima Theatre	
2024	Here in America	Arthur Miller	Orange Tree Theatre	
