= Out in the Dark =

- Theatrical release poster
- Directed by: Michael Mayer
- Starring: Nicholas Jacob; Michael Aloni
- Cinematography: Ran Aviad
- Edited by: Maria Gonzales
- Music by: Mark Holden; Michael Lopez
- Production companies: M7200 Productions; Israel Film Fund; Channel Ten
- Distributed by: Transfax Film Productions
- Release dates: 7 September 2012 (TIFF); 28 February 2013 (Israel)
- Running time: 96 minutes
- Country: Israel
- Languages: Hebrew; Arabic

Out in the Dark (Hebrew: עלטה) is a 2012 Israeli romantic drama film which premiered at the Toronto International Film Festival in September 2012 and in Israel in the Haifa International Film Festival in October 2012. It is the directorial debut of Michael Mayer (Israeli director) (מיכאל מאיר).

The film tells the story of the relationship between Roy, an Israeli lawyer, and Nimer, a Palestinian psychology student. The film was released commercially in Israel on 28 February 2013.

The film has been accredited with 25 awards throughout its creation, which includes the Audience Award at the Berlin Jewish Film Festival in 2013, along with the FilmOut San Diego in 2013.

== Plot ==
The film is set in Israel and Palestine, where Palestinian student Nimer Mashrawi (Nicholas Jacob) is heading to Tel Aviv to meet his friend Mustafa N'amnais (Loai Nofi) at a gay bar. While at the bar, he meets a Jewish lawyer named Roy Scheffer (Michael Aloni). They fall in love, though Nimer struggles with the reality of their relationship. Later in the story, Palestinian society rejects Nimer because of his sexual orientation, whereas initially Israeli society rejects him due to his nationality. The situation is made worse for Nimer when he realises his brother Nabil Mashrawi (Jamil Khoury) is hiding a weapon stockpile for his militant friends.

Nimer is granted a student visa to study at an Israeli university, giving him more opportunity to see Roy. However, he is soon approached by the Israeli Secret Service who pressure him into becoming an informant by threatening to cancel his visa. Nimer refuses and his visa is cancelled. Unbeknownst to Nimer, Mustafa has been living illegally in Tel Aviv under a similar arrangement. When he is unable to provide any more information, he is forcibly deported back to the West Bank where he is immediately abducted by Nabil and his gang of extremists. Nimer is forced to watch as his friend is tortured and executed for being homosexual and an informant.

Later, while going through Mustafa's phone, Nabil and his friends find a photo of Nimer. Despite their differences, Nabil lets Nimer escape rather than killing him. Nimer makes it to Roy's house and hides there. Meanwhile, Nabil's cache of weapons is discovered by the authorities. He is arrested and the police search for Nimer as an accomplice.

Unable to hide him forever, Roy convinces an underworld figure and client of his law firm to smuggle Nimer to France. Though he promises to meet him there in the future, Roy is arrested while distracting the police so Nimer can escape. Nimer makes it to his ship and sails away, unaware of what has happened to Roy.

== Cast ==
- Nicholas Jacob as Nimer Mashrawi
- Michael Aloni as Roy Scheffer
- Jamil Khoury as Nabil Mashrawi
- Alon Pdut as Gil
- Loai Nofi as Mustafa N'amna
- Khawlah Hag-Debsy as Hiam Mashrawi
- Maysa Daw as Abir Mashrawi
- Shimon Mimran as Daniel

== Reception ==
On the review aggregator website Rotten Tomatoes, 79% of 29 critics' reviews are positive. Metacritic, which uses a weighted average, assigned the film a score of 69 out of 100, based on 12 critics, indicating "generally favorable" reviews.

The American film critic, Rex Reed praised the film in The New York Observer: "it’s one of the most powerful films about the Arab-Israeli conflict that has ever been attempted on the screen." Ella Taylor wrote for NPR that "Tel Aviv and the West Bank may be worlds apart in terms of culture, politics and religion, but Mayer cleverly merges them into a single claustrophobic continuum of paranoia, violence and corruption that corrodes everything it touches."

== See also ==
- List of LGBT-related films of 2012
