= Escuela No. 17 Brasil =

School No. 17 Brazil

Location
- Uruguay8
- Coordinates: 34°54′41.2″S 56°09′04″W

Information
- Type: Public
- Established: 1885
- Headmaster: María Inés Robaina
- Website: Official Website
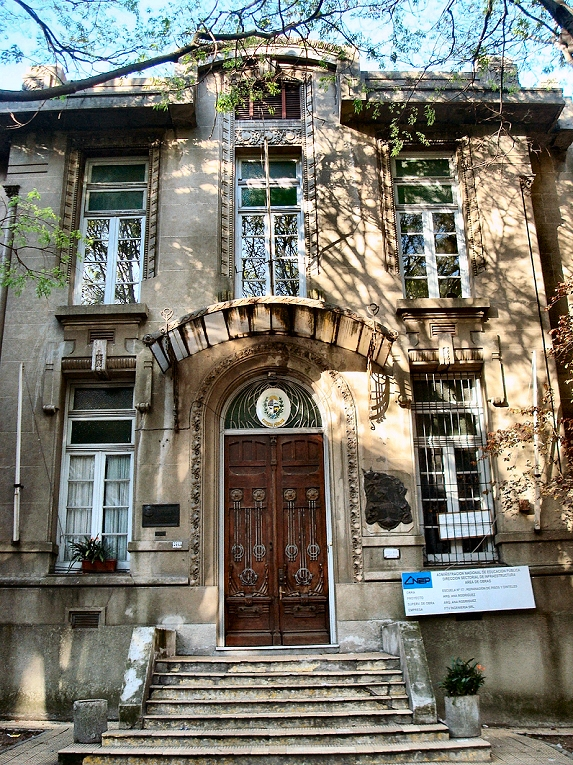

Escuela No. 17 Brasil, or Escuela Brasil, is a public elementary school located in the barrio Pocitos in Montevideo, Uruguay.

== History ==
The original building was designed and constructed by architect Americo Maini in 1908. It was founded in 1885 and originally located on 85 Gabriel Pereira Street. It shared the premises with Escuela No. 18 – Noruega (School No. 18 Norway). In 1904 the government bought the parcel of land located on what was then Avenida de los Pocitos (Avenue of the Pocitos) and is now called Avenida Brasil (Brazil Avenue). On November 15, 1927 the school was named Brazil. From 1949 until 2002 the school shared the premises with Escuela No. 71 Baron de Rio Branco (School No. 71). Since 1993 it had been considered a building of local interest and in 2002 was declared a National Heritage Site by resolution 1.448/002 of the Ministry of Education and Culture. The design and in particular its tiled roof, main entrance and its railings are an outstanding example of modernist architecture, which is quite common in Pocitos.

The main entrance of the old building is on Avenida Brasil 2963, while the school occupies most of the block between streets Avenida Brasil, 26 de Marzo and José Martí. Behind the left wing of the original building has been annexed a building originally designed with 3 levels, of which only 2 levels were constructed. The annex was designed to expand the leasable capacity of this institution. With the same purpose, architect Marcelo de Vita projected classrooms for temporary use in 1969. At the same time and by the same architect, the gym was designed, which was built after the construction of the annexed building along with two accesses from Jose Marti street.

== Notable alumni ==
- Liber Seregni
- Claudio Williman
- Carlos Páez Vilaró
- Antonio Mercader
- Nancy Guguich
- Alvaro Ardao
- Gustavo Rey
- Paolo Montero
