= Joseph Harmatz =

Lithuanian Jewish partisan and philanthropist

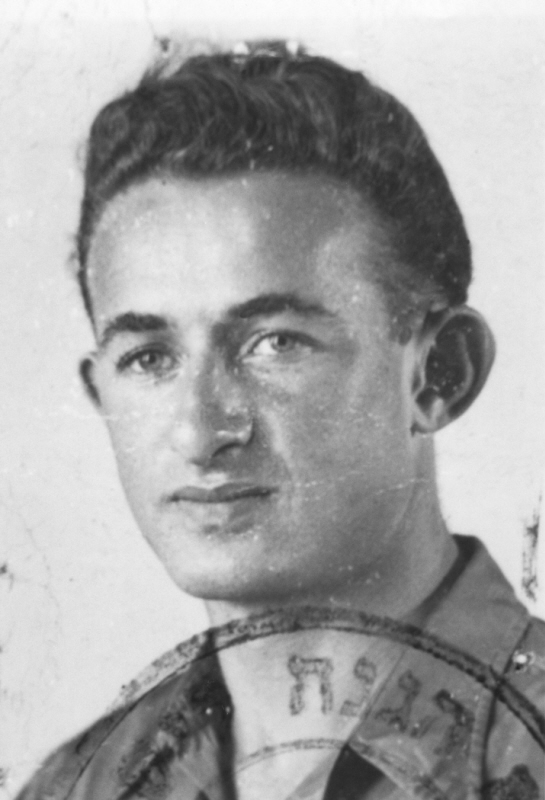
- Native name: יוסף חרמץ
- Born: January 23, 1925; Rakishok, Lithuania
- Died: September 22, 2016 (Aged 91); Tel Aviv, Israel

Joseph Harmatz (Hebrew: יוסף חרמץ; 23 January 1925 – 22 September 2016) was a Lithuanian Jew who fought as a partisan during World War II. After the war, he joined Nakam and plotted acts of revenge that were aimed at killing Nazis and other Germans to avenge Jewish deaths during the Holocaust. After emigrating to Israel, he headed World ORT, a Jewish non-profit organization that promotes education and training in communities around the world.

== Early life ==
Born into a prosperous family in Rokiškis, Lithuania, on 23 January 1925, Harmatz was transferred to the Vilnius Ghetto, together with his family, after the occupation of Lithuania by Nazi Germany. His youngest brother and all of his grandparents were killed and his older brother died during a military action. His despondent father committed suicide. Left alone with his mother at the age of 16, Harmatz left the ghetto through the sewers and joined a band of guerrillas fighting the Nazis.

== Nakam ==
After the war, Harmatz became part of Nakam (Hebrew for Revenge), a group of 50 former underground fighters led by Abba Kovner that was dedicated to efforts to avenge the deaths of the six million Jewish victims of Nazi extermination efforts in the Holocaust. Harmatz told The Observer in 1998 that the goal of Nakam was the death of as many Germans as possible, with the group planning "to kill six million Germans, one for every Jew slaughtered by the Germans", acknowledging that the effort "was revenge, quite simply. Were we not entitled to our revenge, too?"

Harmatz and his associates targeted Stalag XIII-D, a prisoner-of-war camp built on what had been the Nazi party rally grounds in Nuremberg, that was being used to intern 12,000 members of the SS, many of whom had been involved in running concentration camps and other aspects of the Final Solution, Nazi Germany's policy of deliberate and systematic genocide across German-occupied Europe. In April 1946, a member of the group got a job as a baker and used arsenic to poison 3,000 loaves of bread that were to be fed to the prisoners. Nearly 2,000 prisoners were sickened; they were described in The New York Times as being "seriously ill", though American authorities thought that the arsenic had got onto the crust of the bread by accident and had been used as an insecticide. United States Army investigators found enough arsenic to have killed 60,000 people and Nakam claimed several hundred victims, but declassified documents obtained by Associated Press in 2016 stated there were no deaths. Harmatz's son would later say that his father had no regret for his attempts to kill these Germans, saying that he was only "sorry that it didn't work". In his 1998 book From the Wings, Harmatz alleged that the poisoning plot had the approval of Chaim Weizmann, though David Ben-Gurion and Zalman Shazar were both against the plan.

An earlier attempt to poison the water in a number of German cities failed after Kovner was arrested by British forces on a ship on which the poison had been hidden, and had been thrown overboard to prevent its capture. According to his son, Harmatz was thankful in retrospect that the plot to poison the water supplies in German cities had failed, saying that it would have harmed efforts to create an incipient State of Israel and would have led to charges of moral equivalence between actions of Germans and Jews. Another effort to kill Nazi war criminals on trial at Nuremberg failed when the group was unable to find any U.S. Army guards willing to participate.

== Later life ==
After emigrating to Israel in 1950, Harmatz worked to aid Jews resettling from countries around the world. From 1960 to 1994, he headed World ORT, a Jewish non-profit organization that promotes education and training in communities around the world.

A resident of Tel Aviv, Harmatz died on 22 September 2016, at his home at the age of 91. He was survived by two sons.
