= Nuestra Señora de Fátima, Pocitos, Montevideo =

Roman Catholic parish church in Pocitos, Montevideo, Uruguay

Iglesia de Nuestra Señora de Fátima
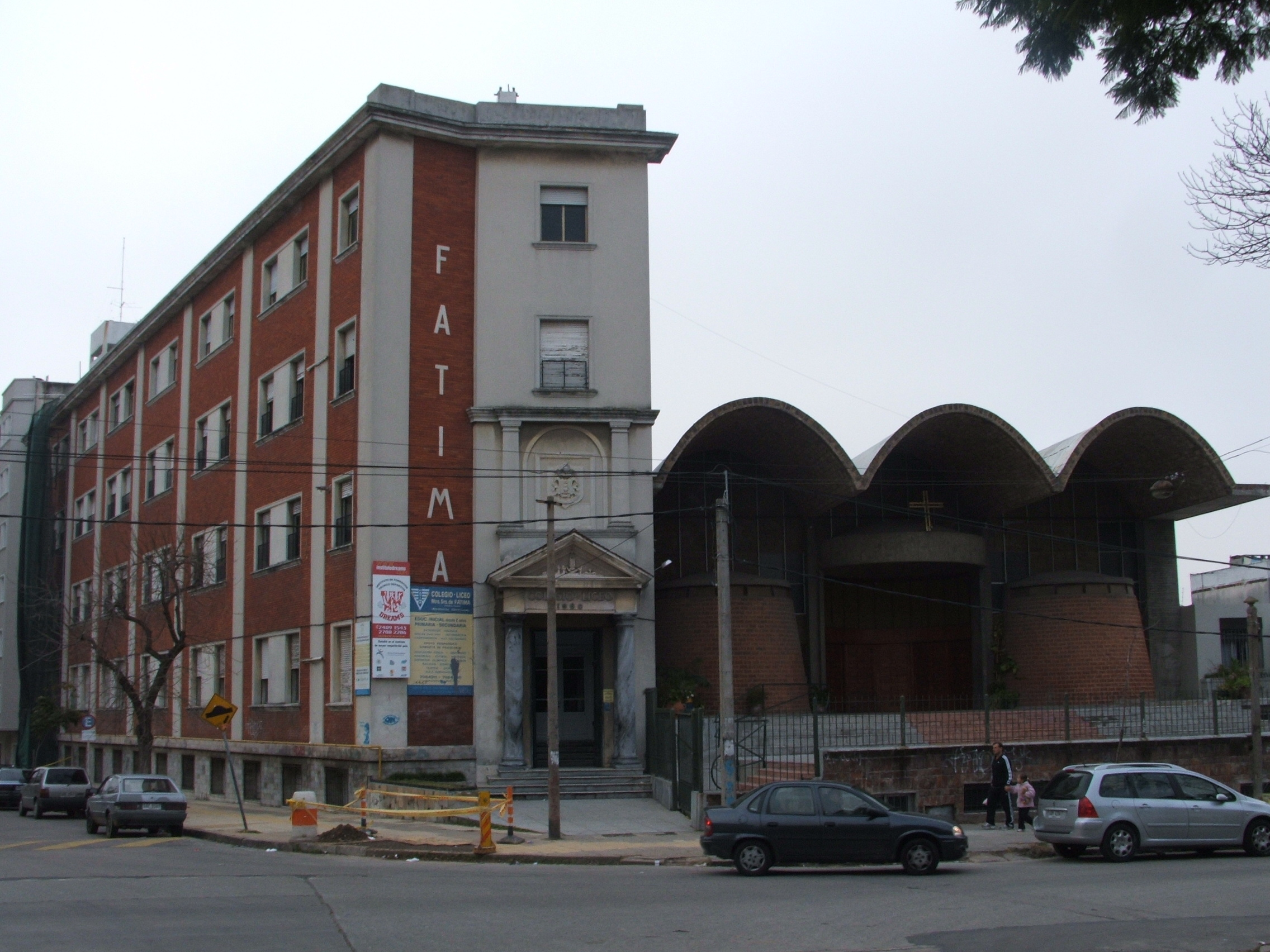
- School and parish church "Fátima" in Pocitos

Religion
- Affiliation: Roman Catholic
- Ecclesiastical or organisational status: Parish church

Location
- Location: Gral. Brito del Pino 1344; Montevideo, Uruguay
- Interactive map of Iglesia de Nuestra Señora de Fátima

Architecture
- Type: Church

The Church of Our Lady of Fatima (Spanish: Iglesia de Nuestra Señora de Fátima) is a Roman Catholic parish church in the neighbourhood of Pocitos, Montevideo, Uruguay.

The parish was established on 1 May 1954. The temple is dedicated to the Virgin of Fatima. It is held by the Claretians, who also run the adjacent private school Colegio y Liceo Nuestra Señora de Fátima (established in 1960). Originally the celebrations were held in a crypt under the school; the current temple was built in the early 1980s, in brickwork.

== Same devotion ==
There are other churches in Uruguay dedicated to Our Lady of Fatima:

- Parish Church of Our Lady of Fatima in Villa del Cerro
- Fatima Chapel in Punta del Este
- Parish Church of Our Lady of Fatima in Rocha
- Our Lady of Fatima Chapel in Colonia Valdense
- Our Lady of Fatima Parish Church in Minas
- Our Lady of Fatima Parish Church in San José de Mayo
