= Liceo Joaquin Suarez (Montevideo) =

Coordinates: 34°54′59″S 56°09′13″W

High school No. 7 Joaquín Suárez
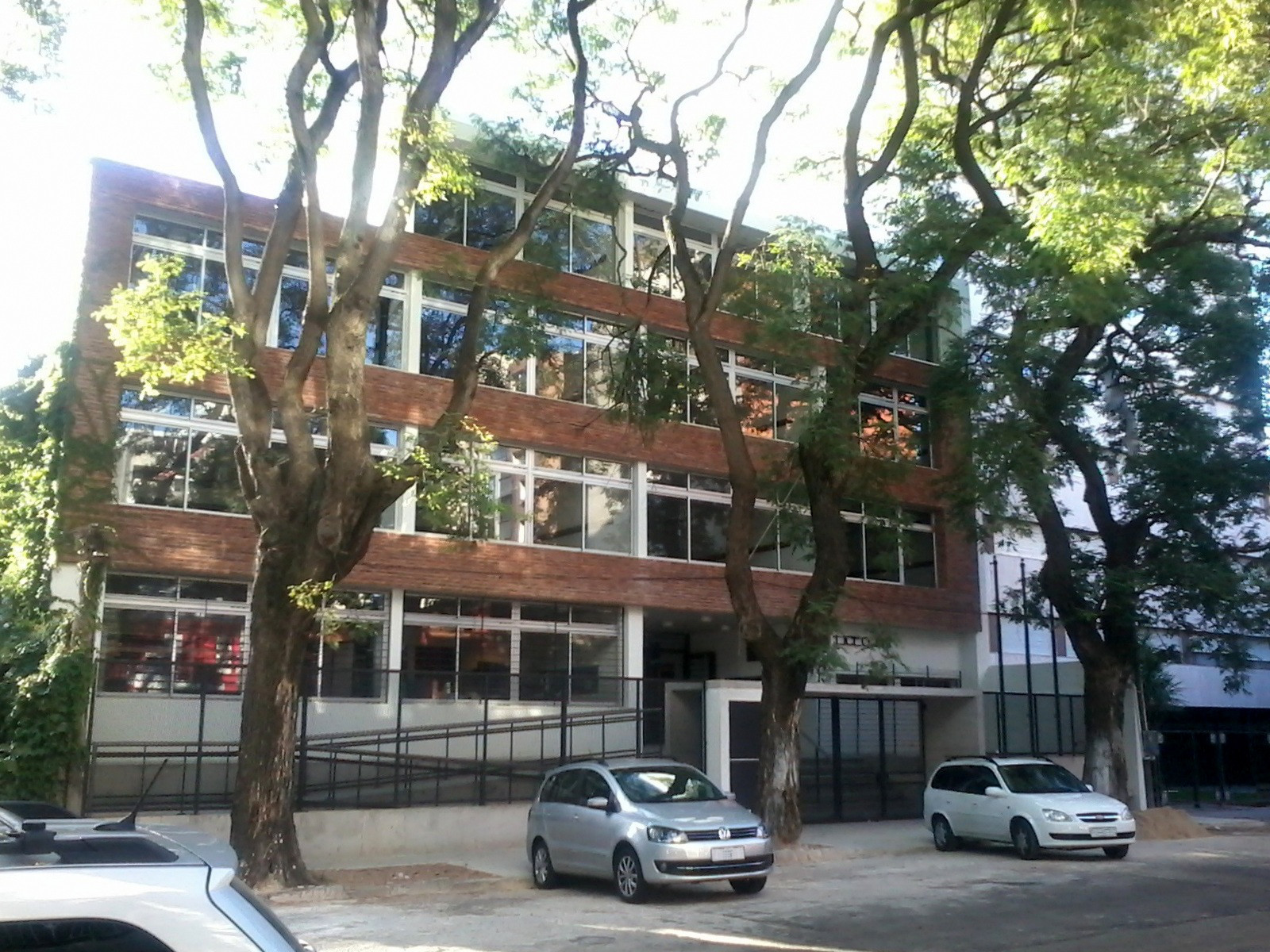
- Uruguay; Montevideo

Information
- Type: Public
- Established: 1944
- Headmaster: María Lourdes Pérez Abadie
- Campus: Pocitos

Liceo Joaquín Suárez, officially designated Liceo No. 7 of Montevideo, is a public secondary school located in the Pocitos neighborhood of Montevideo, Uruguay. Founded in 1944, it was the first public secondary school in the area and was named after Joaquín Suárez, the seventh president of Uruguay. Liceo Joaquín Suárez, officially designated Liceo No. 7 of Montevideo, is a public secondary school located in the Pocitos neighborhood of Montevideo, Uruguay. Founded in 1944, it was the first public secondary school in the area and was named after Joaquín Suárez, the seventh president of Uruguay.

From 1944 to 1948 its location was in Magallanes street where he shared the building with the Italian School, a place that later the Faculty of Economics and Faculty of Humanities later. That same year, Professor Juan Carlos Sábat Pébet, writer, journalist, historical researcher and poet, (elected director Joaquín Suárez 1945), is the driving force behind the transfer of this high school to the district Pocitos, Spain 2772 Boulevard street. Later he moved to the street Jaime Zudañez 2730.
