= Nakam (book) =

2019 book by Dina Porat

- First edition
- Author: Dina Porat
- Original title: לי נקם ושילם: היישוב, השואה וקבוצת הנוקמים של אבא קובנר
- Language: Hebrew
- Genre: Non-fiction
- Publisher: Pardes Publishing, Haifa University Press
- Publication date: 2019

Nakam: The Holocaust Survivors Who Sought Full-Scale Revenge (originally published in Hebrew as לי נקם ושילם: היישוב, השואה וקבוצת הנוקמים של אבא קובנר, transl. Vengeance and Retribution Are Mine: Community, the Holocaust, and Abba Kovner's Avengers, also published in German) is a book by Israeli historian Dina Porat on Nakam, a small paramilitary organization of Holocaust survivors led by Abba Kovner and which plotted genocidal revenge against the German people. Porat chose the title to express her belief that the Jewish people should leave revenge to the God of Israel. It was first published in 2019 by Pardes Publishing / Haifa University Press in Hebrew. Although Porat says that her book is the first scholarly work on Nakam, there was also a German book on the subject published in 2000 by Jim G. Tobias and Peter Zinke.
