= Guillermo Rocamora =

Uruguayan film director

- Born: 1981 (age 44–45)
- Occupation: filmmaker
- Known for: won awards for directing documentaries

Guillermo Rocamora (born 1981) is a Uruguayan filmmaker. He first started working as a filmmaker in 2004. He worked for three years on his directorial debut, Solo, prior to its release, in 2015. He is a graduate of the Universidad de la República and also studied at the Escuela Internacional de Cine y Televisión in Cuba.

In 2019 he released a documentary on Mohammed Abdullah Taha Mattan, one of six individuals formerly held in the Guantanamo detention camps for 12 years, who were granted political asylum in Uruguay in 2014. That documentary, La Libertad es una palabra grande, won the award for best documentary at the International Film Week in Valladolid.
