= Lukšić =

Lukšić is a Croatian surname. It may refer to:

- Andrónico Luksic (1926–2005) Chilean businessman of Croatian origin and founder of the Luksic Group
- Carl J. Luksic (1921–2009), American flying ace during World War II
- Guillermo Luksic Craig (1956–2013), Chilean businessman, son and heir of Andrónico Luksic
- Igor Lukšić (1976), Montenegrin politician, Prime Minister of Montenegro 2010–2012
- Igor Lukšič (born 1961), Slovenian political scientist and politician
- Kaštel Lukšić, a town within the administrative area of Kaštela in Dalmatia, Croatia
- Oliver Luksic (born 1979), German politician

Another version of the same surname is Lussich:

- Antonio Lussich (1848–1928), Uruguayan sailor, arboriculturist and writer
- Lussich Arboretum, an artificial forest in Uruguay
- Lussich Cove, a cove at the south Shetland Islands
