= Beit Yaacov Synagogue =

Beit Yaacov Synagogue (Hebrew: "House of Jacob") may refer to current or former synagogues in the following countries;

== The Philippines ==
- Beit Yaacov Synagogue, Manila

== Uruguay ==
- Beit Yaacov Synagogue, Punta del Este

== See also ==
- B'nai Jacob
