= Isla de Lobos Lighthouse =

Lighthouse in Uruguay

Isla de Lobos Lighthouse Faro de Isla de Lobos
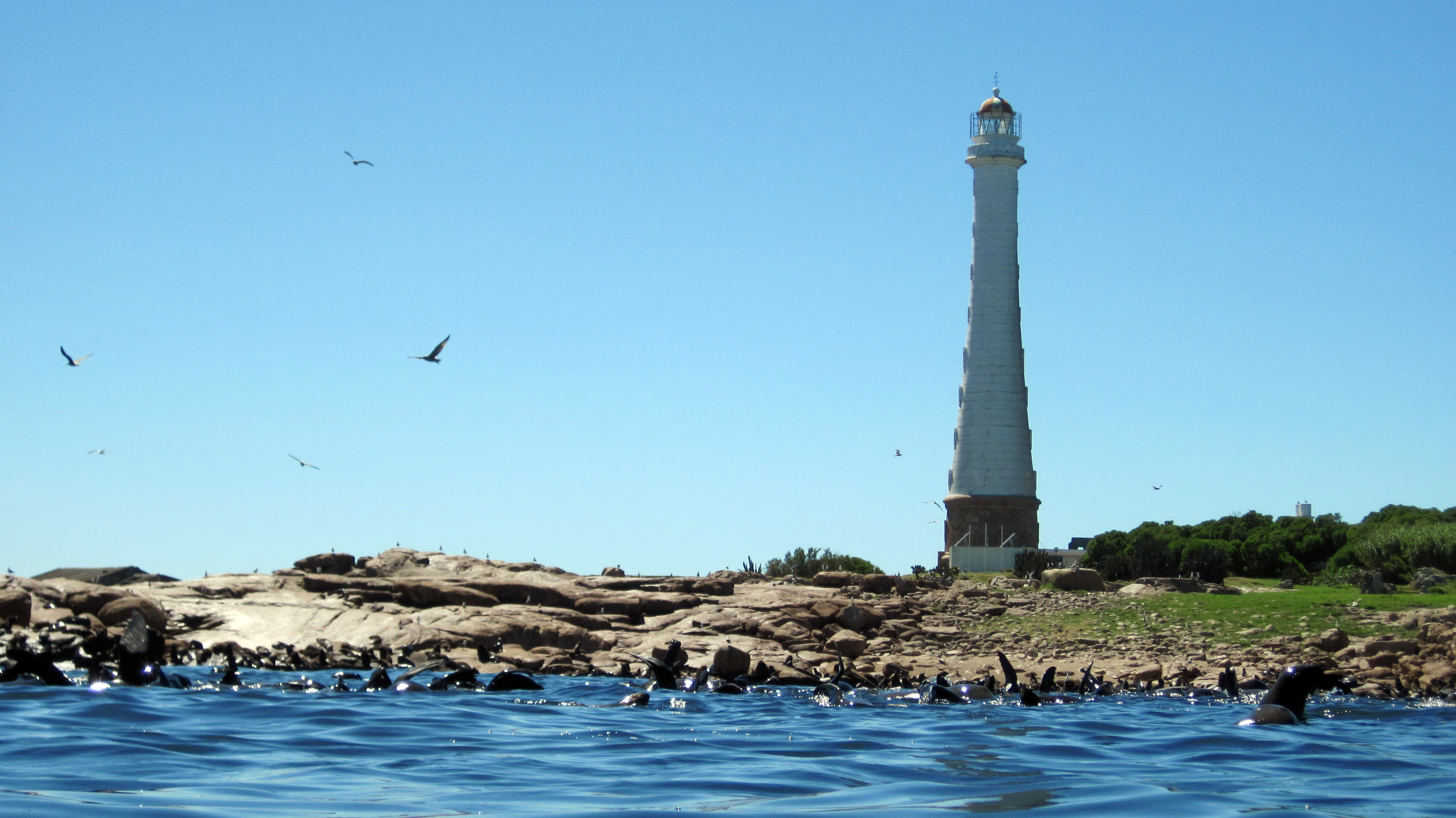
- Isla de Lobos lighthouse in 2013. In the foreground, sea lions and fur seals.
- Location: Isla de Lobos; Punta del Este; Maldonado Department; Uruguay
- Coordinates: 35°01′28.3″S 54°53′00.2″W

Tower
- Constructed: 1906
- Automated: 2001
- Height: 50 metres (160 ft)
- Operator: National Navy of Uruguay

Light
- Focal height: 59 metres (194 ft)

Isla de Lobos Lighthouse (Spanish: Faro de Isla de Lobos) is a lighthouse located on Isla de Lobos in the Atlantic Ocean, not far from Punta del Este, Maldonado Department, Uruguay. The current structure was erected in 1906.

== See also ==
- List of lighthouses in Uruguay
