= Former synagogue of the Uruguayan Jewish Community (1981-2024) =

Former synagogue in Montevideo

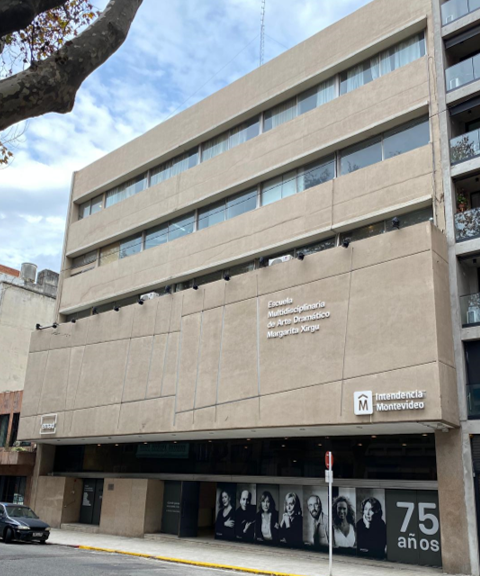
- Former building of the synagogue, as of 2025.

- Location of the former synagogue building in Montevideo

Religion
- Affiliation: Judaism
- Ecclesiastical or organisational status: Synagogue

Location
- Location: Centro, Montevideo
- Country: Uruguay
- Coordinates: 34°54′32″S 56°11′34″W

Architecture
- Completed: 1981

The former synagogue of the Uruguayan Jewish Community (Spanish: Antigua sinagoga de la Comunidad Israelita del Uruguay) is a building located in the Centro neighbourhood of Montevideo, Uruguay, that housed a Jewish congregation and synagogue.

== Overview ==
The Ashkenazi Jewish community settled in Montevideo in the first decades of the 20th century. This temple opened its doors in 1981. In 2023, it was sold to the Margarita Xirgu Multidisciplinary School of Dramatic Art.

Nowadays the community is housed in a new building in the Punta Carretas neighbourhood.

== See also ==
- Uruguayan Jewish Community
- History of the Jews in Uruguay
- List of synagogues in Uruguay
