= Laguna del Sauce =

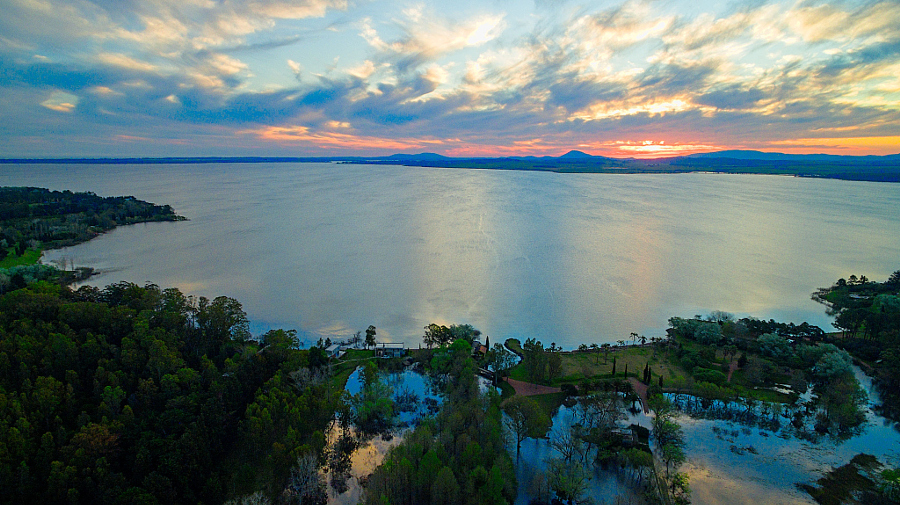
- Laguna del Sauce

- Location within Uruguay
- Location: Maldonado Department of Uruguay
- Coordinates: 34°49′31″S 55°03′37″W
- Type: lagoon
- Primary inflows: Arroyo Pan de Azucar
- Max. length: 12 kilometres (7.5 mi)
- Max. width: 6 kilometres (3.7 mi)
- Surface area: 50 square kilometres (19 sq mi)

Laguna del Sauce (Lagoon of the Willow) is a subtropical shallow lake and the largest water body in the Maldonado Department of Uruguay. It is located 15 kilometres (9.3 mi) west of Punta del Este. The lake is the only freshwater ecosystem in the country classified for drinking water as its principal use.

Originally a coastal lagoon, the lake was damned for military purposes in 1947. The closed ecosystem makes the lake prone to eutrophication, and has had regular algae blooms—one of which, in 2015, included cyanobacteria that disrupted water supplies.

== Geography ==
The lagoon covers 50 square kilometres (19 sq mi) and is 12 kilometres (7.5 mi) long and 6 kilometres (3.7 mi) wide. The maximum depth of the lake is five meters. The lake is part of an interconnected lake system which includes Laguna de los Cisnes (205 ha) and Laguna del Potrero (411 ha).

The Pan de Azucar River discharges into the southwest of the lagoon, while the streams Arroyo del Sauce and Arroyo Mallorquina discharge in its north and northwest. A stream called Arroyo Potrero at the south end of the lagoon empties the water into the Río de la Plata at the beach of Chihuahua. The total input into the lake per year is approximately 285.4 mm3/year.

The catchment for the lake is largely grassland (47.6%) and native forest (16.9%), with some forestry (mainly Eucolyptus) for paper and energy (12.9%). Agricultural use for growing soy, wheat, and sorgum has increased in recent years, reaching 8216 hectares in 2015.

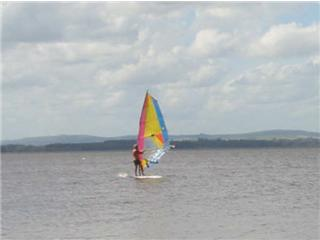
A man windsurfing on the Laguna del Sauce.

== Sports ==
Any kind of non-motor powered water sports are allowed in the lagoon, such as wind surfing.

== Surroundings ==
The Capitan Corbeta CA Curbelo International Airport is in the southwest coast of the lagoon, just east of the lake resort La Capuera. To the southeast is the "Club del Lago Golf" course, to the south of which is the Arboretum Lussich. In the east coast of the lagoon (from south to north) is the park "Parque Jacarandá", the location and resort "Las Cumbres", the hills Sierra de la Ballena, Cerro Caballero, Cerro de la Cruz and the location "Abra del Pedromo", with a statue of San Francisco on the hill Cerro de Francés. On the west coast of the lagoon are the hills Cerro Sanguinetti and Cerro Las Mojinetes.

== Environmental issues ==
=== Eutrophication and algae blooms ===
The closed ecosystem makes the lake prone to eutrophication, and has had regular algae blooms Blooms of the cyanobacteria Raphidiopsis raciborskii in 2004, 2015 and 2020 have that disrupted water supplies.

=== Climate change ===
A 2021 analysis found that the lagoon's low-lying geography and location would be affected by climate change in a number of ways, including: wetter weather, higher temperatures, season shift and more extreme precipitation events. These will in turn likely create worse water quality, because of increased runoff and erosion, in turn challenging the water cycle and water supply in the region.
