= Punta del Este =

Uruguayan seaside resort city

- City
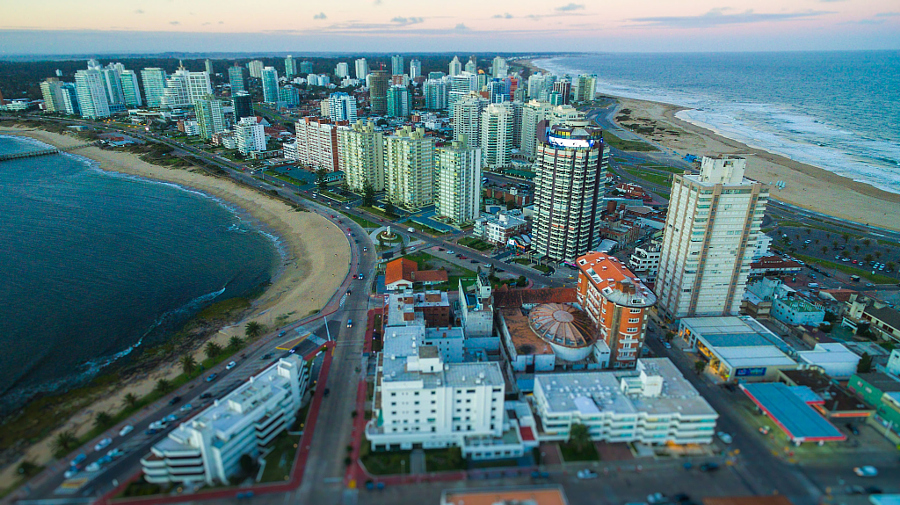
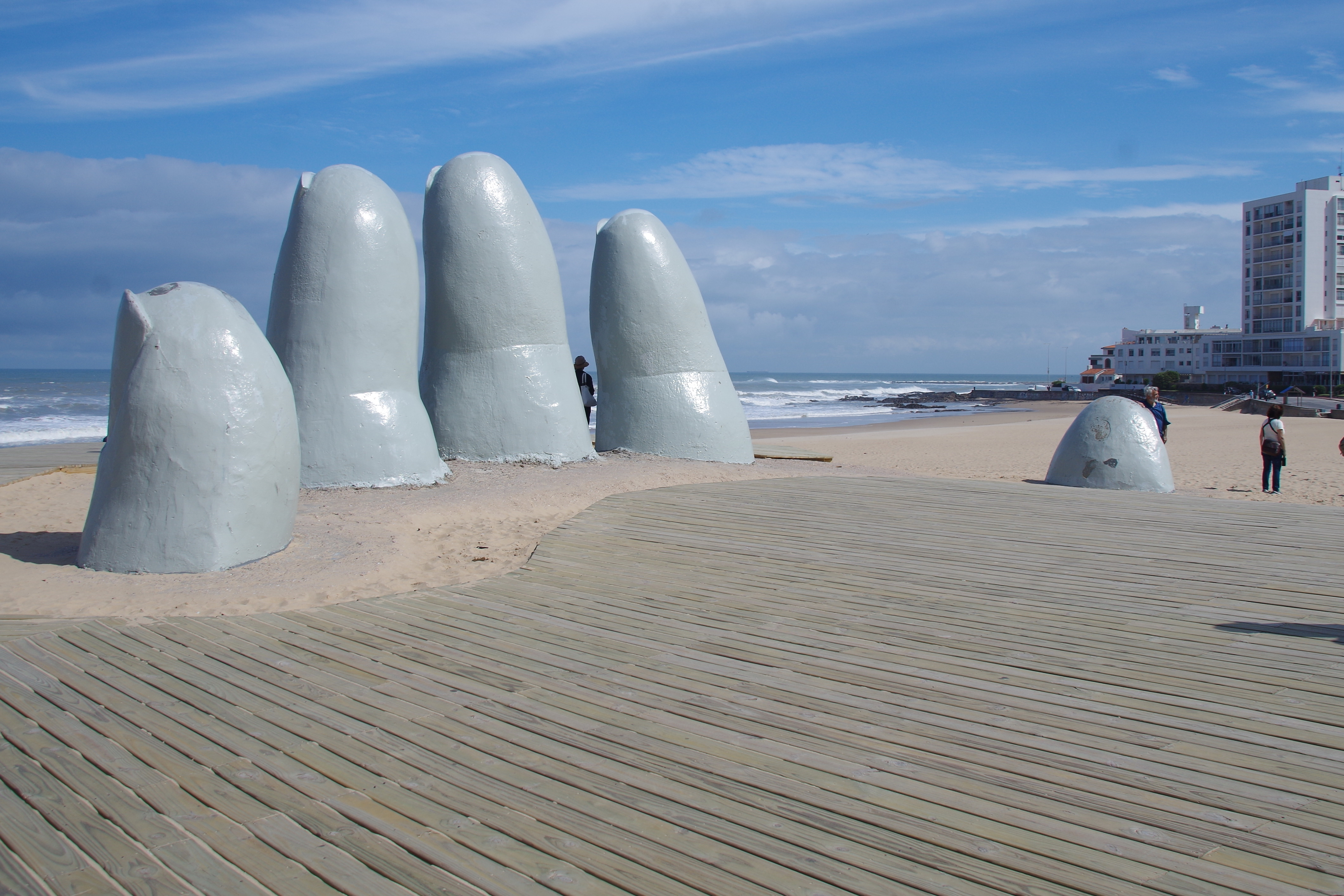
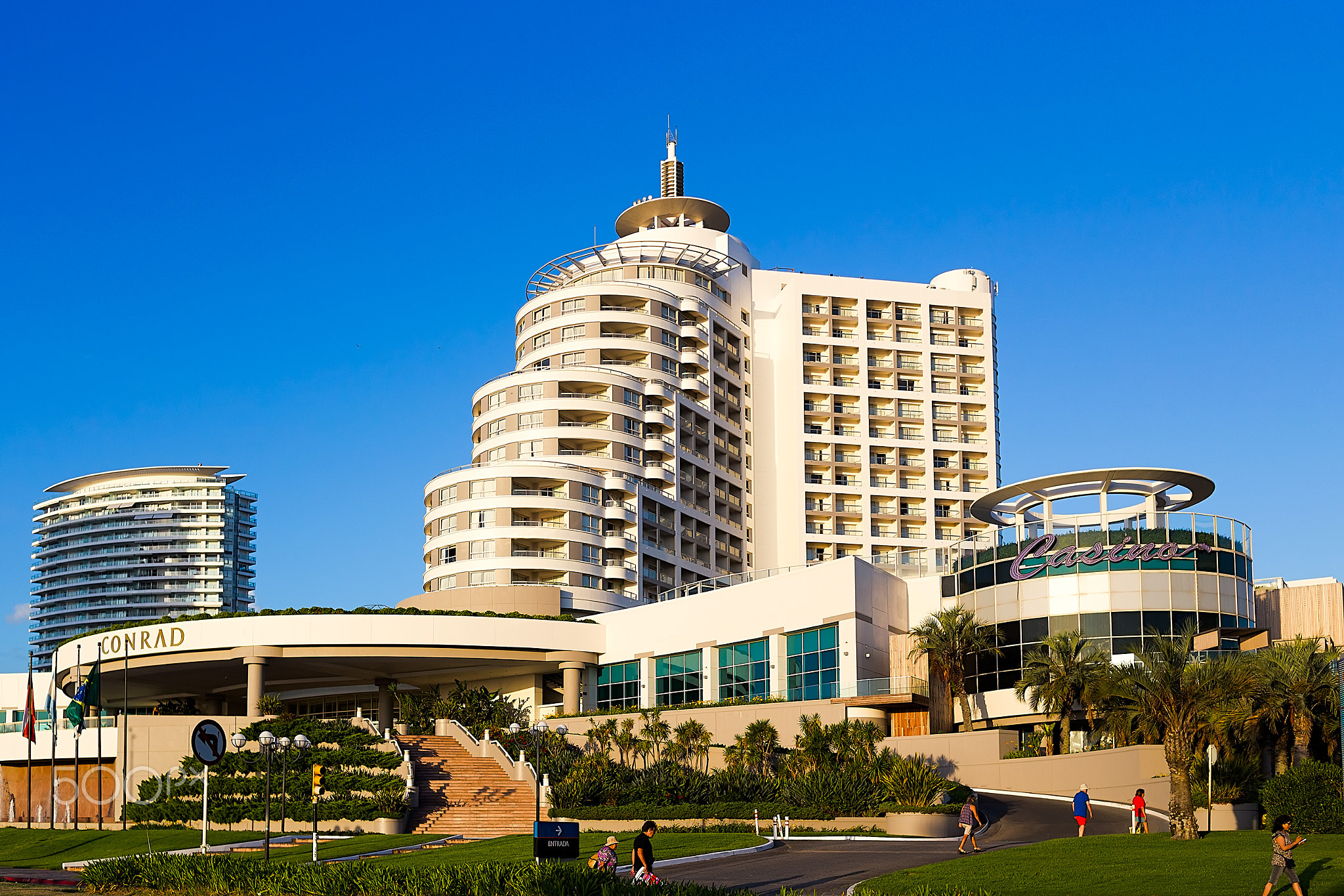
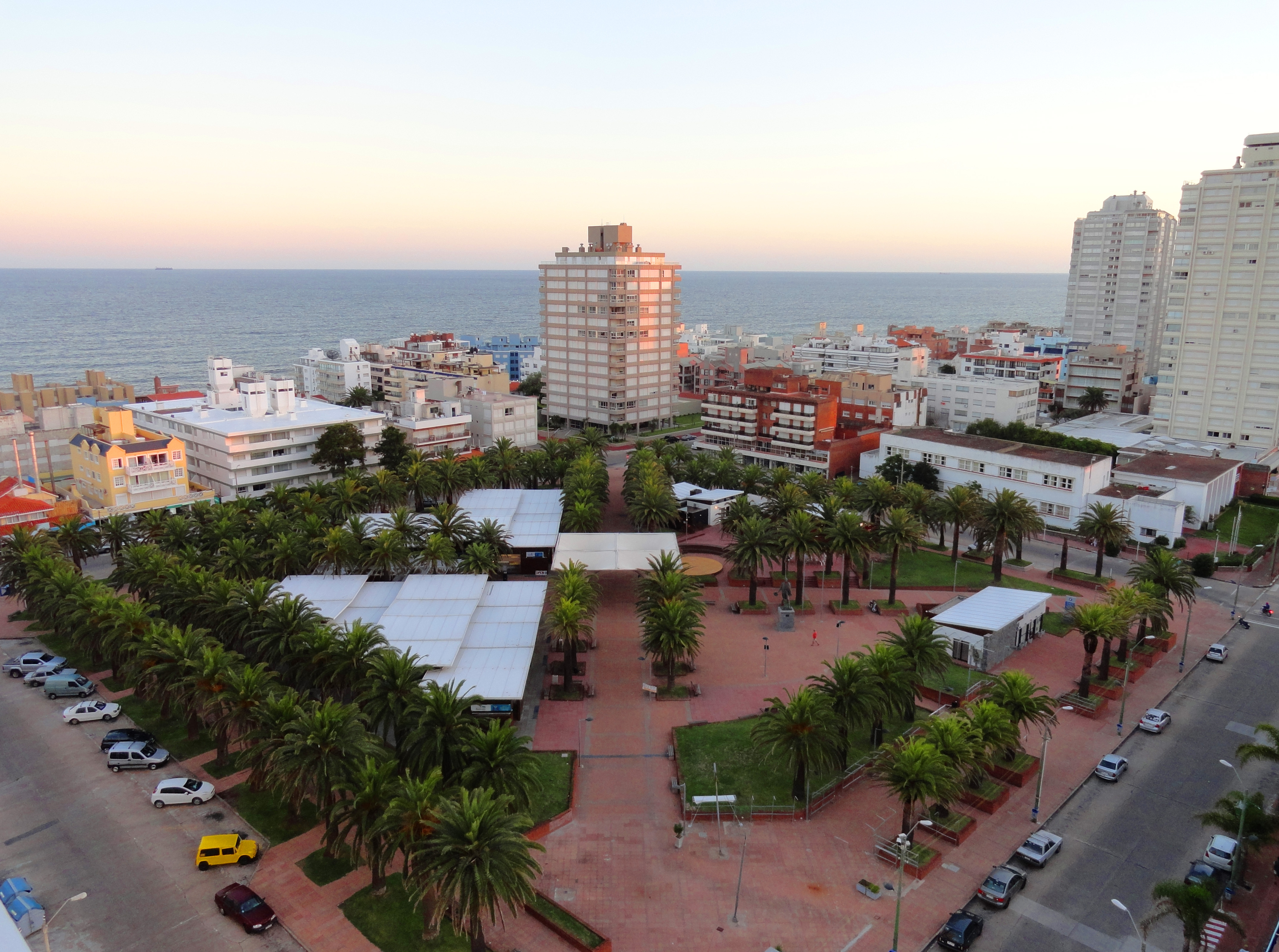
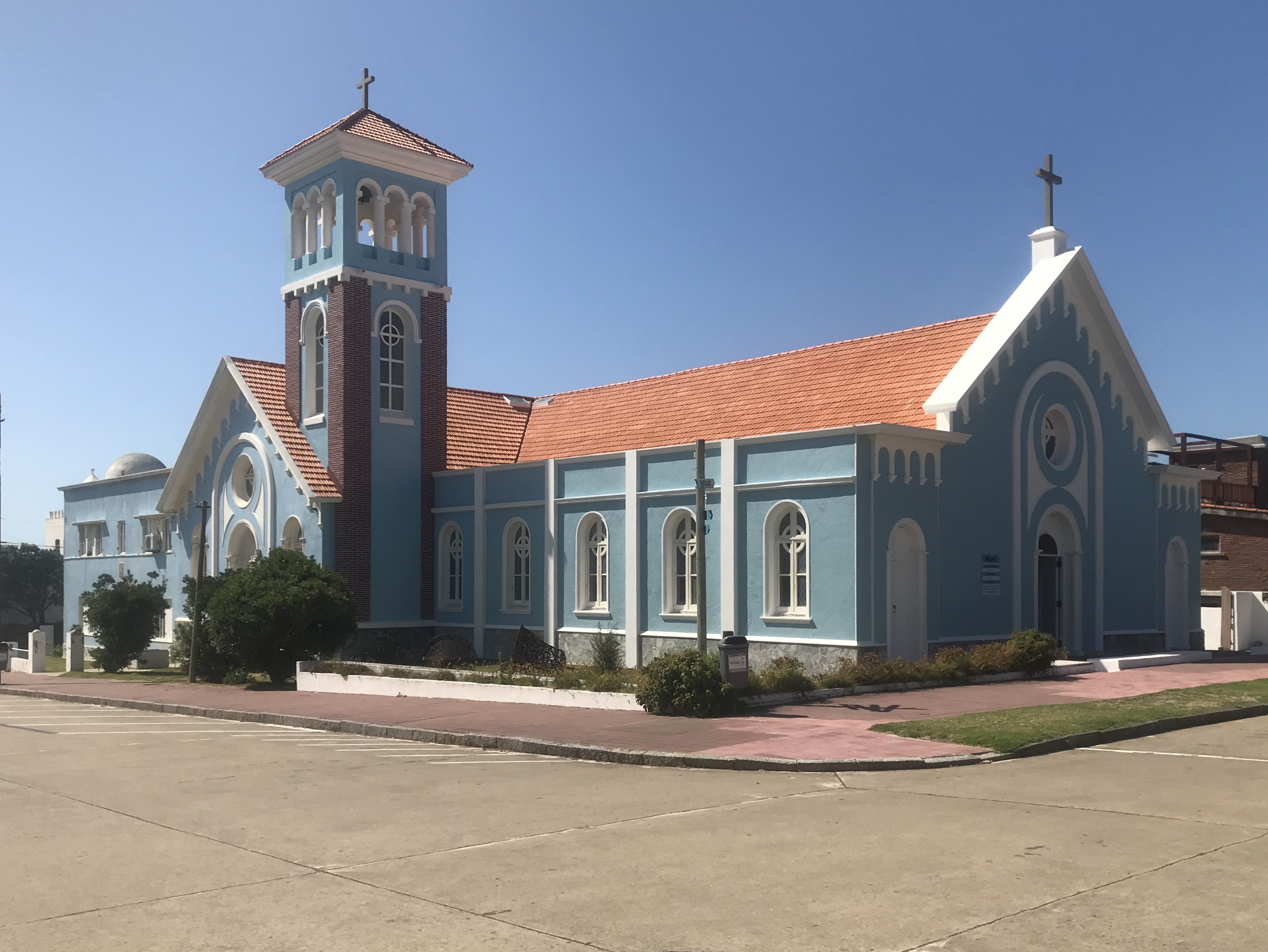
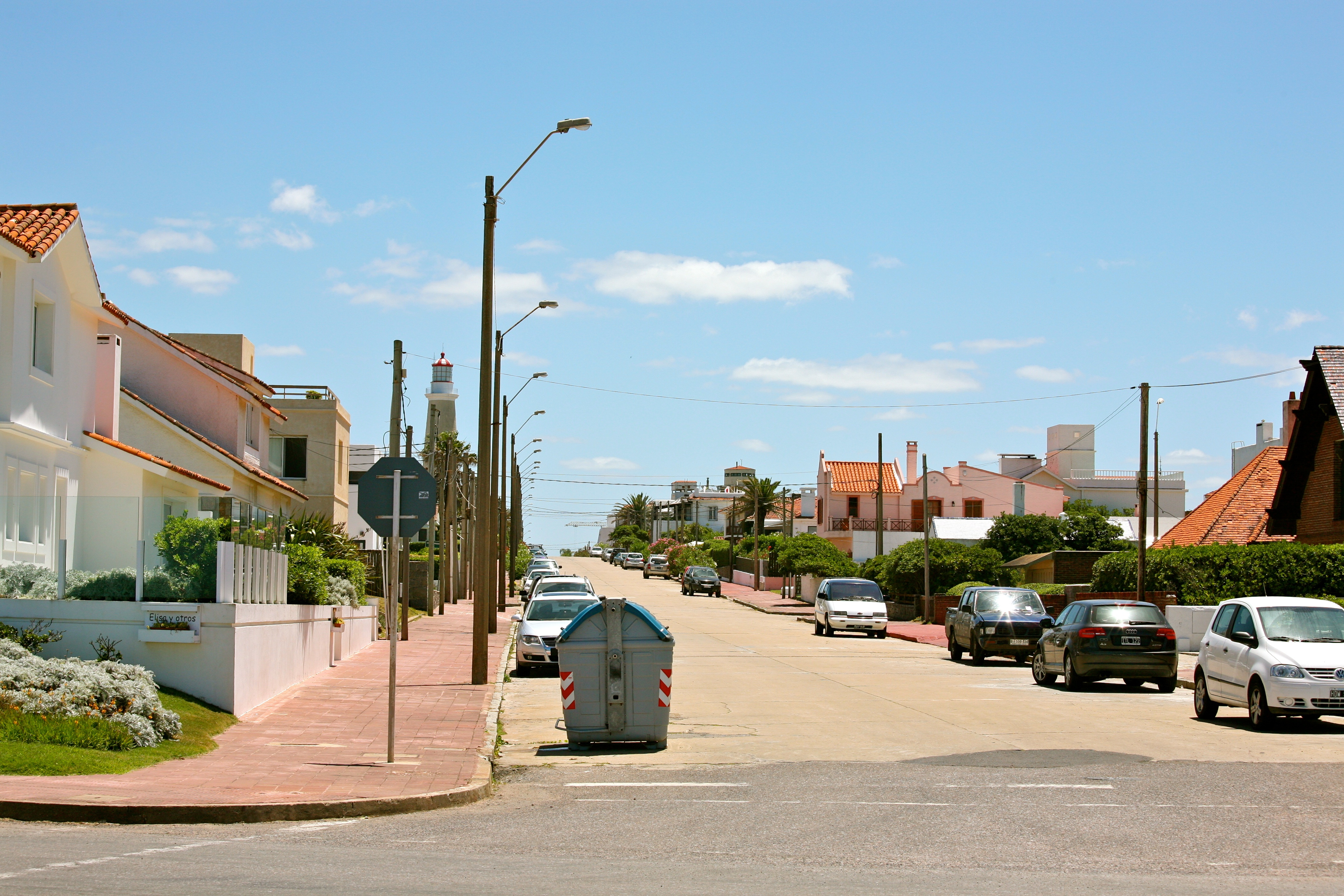
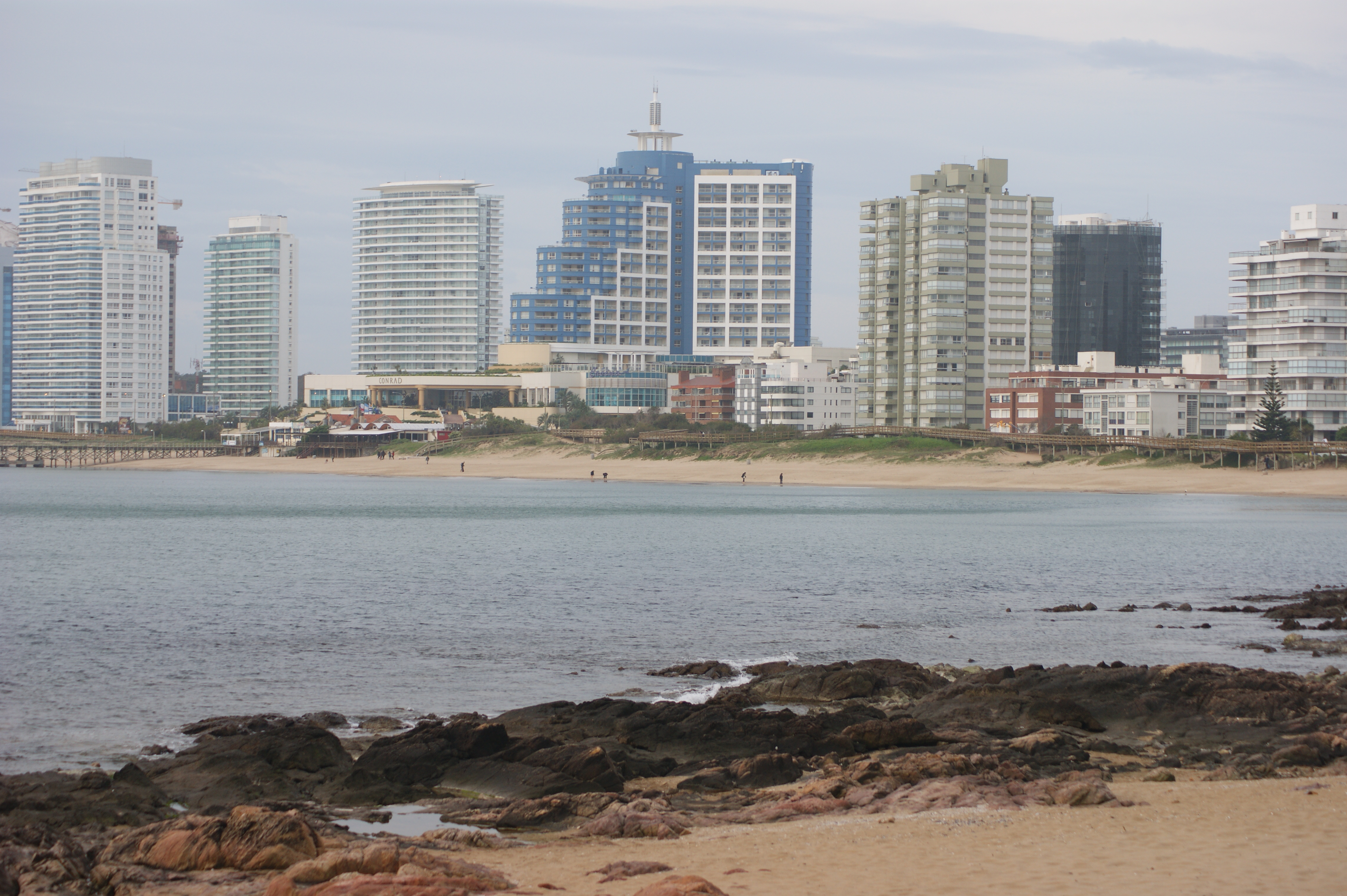
- Aerial view La Mano Enjoy Hotel and Casino Central Square Church of Our Lady of Candelaria Residential area of the peninsula Playa Mansa

- Location in Uruguay Punta del Este (Uruguay)
- Coordinates: 34°58′0″S 54°57′0″W
- Country: Uruguay
- Department: Maldonado
- Founded: 1860

Government
  - Mayor (Alcalde): Javier Carballal (NP)

Area
  - Total: 20.35 km^{2} (7.86 sq mi)

Population (2023 Census)
  - Total: 18,193
- Demonym(s): puntaesteño (m) puntaesteña (f)
- Time zone: UTC−3
- Postal code: 20100
- Dial code: +598 42 (+6 digits)
- Climate: Cfb

Punta del Este (Spanish pronunciation: [ˈpunta ðel ˈeste]) is a seaside city and peninsula on the Atlantic Coast in the Maldonado Department of southeastern Uruguay. Starting as a small town, Punta del Este grew to become a resort for the Latin and North American jet set and tourists. The city has been called "The Hamptons of South America", as well as "The Monaco of the South", "The Miami Beach of South America", "The Pearl of the Atlantic", and "The St. Tropez of South America". Many famous people have visited, resided, or acquired vacation properties in Punta del Este and its surroundings.

Punta del Este hosted the Whitbread Around the World yacht races from 1985 to 1994 and participated with its own yacht 'Uruguay Natural'. Punta del Este also hosted the 1967 American Summit attended by U.S. President Lyndon Johnson, and the beginning of the Uruguay Round of international trade negotiations in 1986 that led to the creation of the World Trade Organization in 1994. The city hosted the 2014 Formula E Championship and the Gran Premio de Punta del Este receiving national, South American and international competitions.

In addition to international film festivals, gastronomy, and first-class hotels, the region has protected natural reserves such as Isla de Lobos, Gorriti Island, La Barra, or the Arboretum Lussich. Popular landmarks in the area include the La Mano giant sculpture, the Santorini-styled complex Casapueblo, the Rafael Viñoly designed Puente Garzón bridge, and the Museum of the Sea. Although the city has a year-round population of about 18,200 in winter, the number greatly expands during the summer season.

== Geography ==
=== Location ===
The city is located on the intersection of Route 10 with Route 39, southeast of the department capital Maldonado and about 140 kilometres (87 mi) east of Montevideo.

=== Climate ===
Punta del Este has an oceanic climate (Cfb, according to the Köppen climate classification), with pleasant summers and cool winters. Because of the average temperature of the hottest month near 22 °C (71.6 °F), the climate is close to a humid subtropical climate (Cfa). It is similar to southeastern Australia. The precipitation is evenly distributed throughout the year, with an average of 1,010 mm (40 in). The hottest month, February, has an average temperature of 21.7 °C (71.1 °F), and the coldest month, July, has an average of 11.5 °C (52.7 °F). The average yearly temperature is 16.4 °C (61.5 °F).

Climate data for Punta del Este (Península), elevation: 16 m, 1961–1990 normals
Month	Jan	Feb	Mar	Apr	May	Jun	Jul	Aug	Sep	Oct	Nov	Dec	Year
Record high °C (°F)	37.0 (98.6)	34.4 (93.9)	34.4 (93.9)	30.6 (87.1)	29.8 (85.6)	26.6 (79.9)	28.3 (82.9)	27.4 (81.3)	31.0 (87.8)	31.8 (89.2)	32.2 (90.0)	37.6 (99.7)	37.6 (99.7)
Mean daily maximum °C (°F)	25.2 (77.4)	25.1 (77.2)	24.0 (75.2)	21.2 (70.2)	18.2 (64.8)	14.8 (58.6)	14.4 (57.9)	14.7 (58.5)	16.0 (60.8)	18.4 (65.1)	21.0 (69.8)	23.8 (74.8)	19.7 (67.5)
Daily mean °C (°F)	21.6 (70.9)	21.7 (71.1)	20.6 (69.1)	17.9 (64.2)	15.0 (59.0)	12.2 (54.0)	11.5 (52.7)	11.6 (52.9)	12.8 (55.0)	15.0 (59.0)	17.4 (63.3)	20.0 (68.0)	16.4 (61.5)
Mean daily minimum °C (°F)	18.1 (64.6)	18.4 (65.1)	17.6 (63.7)	14.9 (58.8)	12.1 (53.8)	9.5 (49.1)	8.7 (47.7)	8.8 (47.8)	9.9 (49.8)	11.4 (52.5)	14.1 (57.4)	16.4 (61.5)	13.3 (55.9)
Record low °C (°F)	10.2 (50.4)	11.6 (52.9)	10.4 (50.7)	6.8 (44.2)	3.4 (38.1)	−0.2 (31.6)	1.4 (34.5)	1.4 (34.5)	1.6 (34.9)	4.0 (39.2)	7.4 (45.3)	7.0 (44.6)	−0.2 (31.6)
Average precipitation mm (inches)	75.4 (2.97)	84.8 (3.34)	79.3 (3.12)	84.0 (3.31)	91.4 (3.60)	80.3 (3.16)	90.3 (3.56)	93.9 (3.70)	93.1 (3.67)	85.0 (3.35)	86.8 (3.42)	66.6 (2.62)	1,010.9 (39.82)
Average precipitation days	8	9	9	9	9	10	10	9	9	9	8	8	107
Mean monthly sunshine hours	263.8	212.5	243.0	181.3	147.0	103.8	118.8	157.5	169.3	234.5	217.5	289.3	2,338.3
Source 1: WMO
Source 2: NOAA (extremes, sun and mean temperature)

== History ==
Spaniards were the first Europeans to set foot in the area of Punta del Este at the beginning of the 16th century. Colonization began around Maldonado at the end of the 18th century through Portuguese expansionism.

In August 1827, during the Cisplatine War, a three-day military operation led by Brigadier General Juan Antonio Lavalleja under the banner of the United Provinces of the Río de la Plata failed to expel a small brazilian garrison strategically located on the peninsula.

Punta del Este and its surroundings (Maldonado and Punta Ballena) at the end of the 19th century were kilometers of sand and dunes, but in 1896 Antonio Lussich bought 4,447 acres (1,800 ha) of uninhabited land and started the botanical garden Arboretum Lussich, planting trees and plants from all over the world. The trees propagated on their own, with Pines, Eucalyptus, Acacias and various species of bushes flourishing.

On 5 July 1907, it was declared a "Pueblo" (village) by Act of Ley 3.186. Its status was elevated to "Ciudad" (city) on 2 July 1957 by the Act of Ley Nº 12.397.

During the 1970s, the city faced a decline in tourists, especially from Argentina, as a result of terrorist threats by the Tupamaros guerrilla organization and an increase of working class hotels and less luxurious residences.

Punta del Este experienced formidable real estate development in the 1980s with a construction boom in spas, apartment towers and hotel complexes. Since then, the ups and downs of the economic cycles caused real estate activity to be another engine of the economy of Punta del Este. In 2022, real estate market specialists forecast exponential growth throughout the area as a place to live year-round.

== Population ==
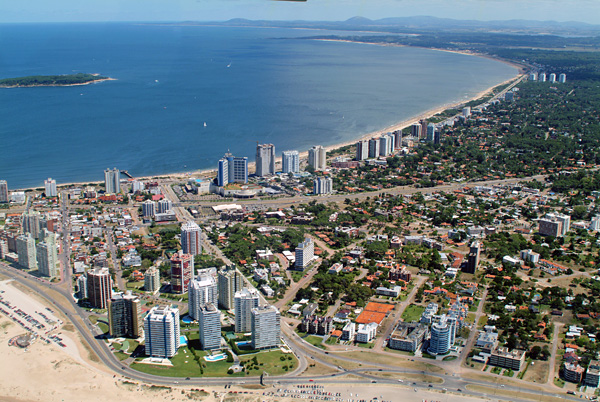
Chiverta Ave. from Playa Brava (Rough Sea Beach) to Playa Mansa (back). Gorriti Island.

In 2011 Punta del Este city proper had a population of 9,277 and 23,954 households and apartments. According to the Intendencia Departamental de Maldonado, the municipality of Punta del Este has an area of 48 km^{2} (19 sq mi) and a population of 15,000. Argentines, Brazilians and Europeans are gradually choosing Punta del Este as their permanent residence. Some of the reasons are peace in the midst of nature and increasing educational offerings.

Year	Population
1963	5,272
1975	7,197
1985	6,731
1996	8,294
2004	7,298
2011	9,277
2023	18,193

Source: National Statistics Institute

== Panorama ==
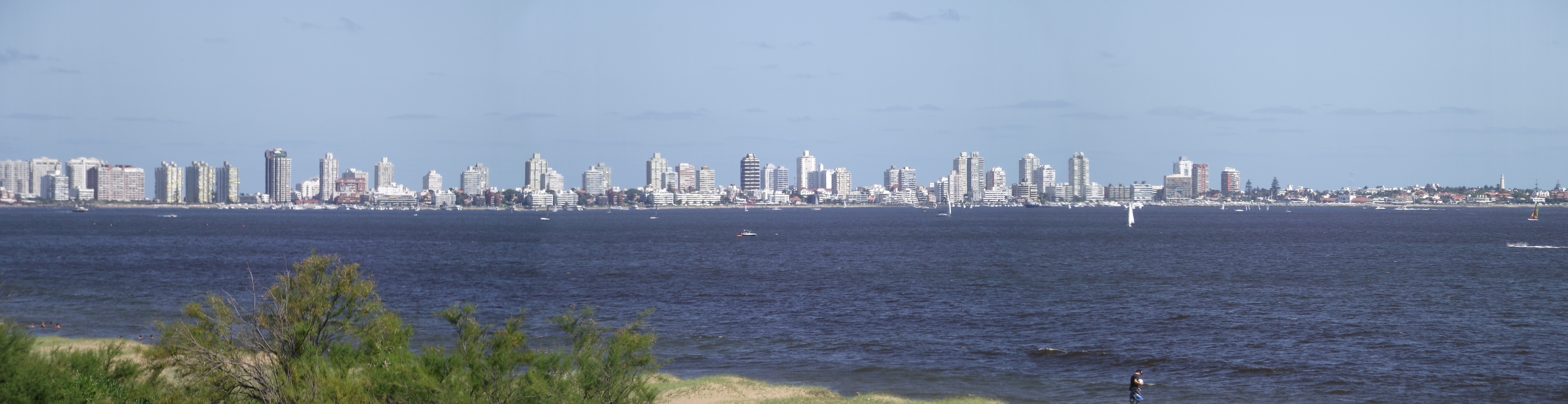
A panoramic photo of Punta del Este.
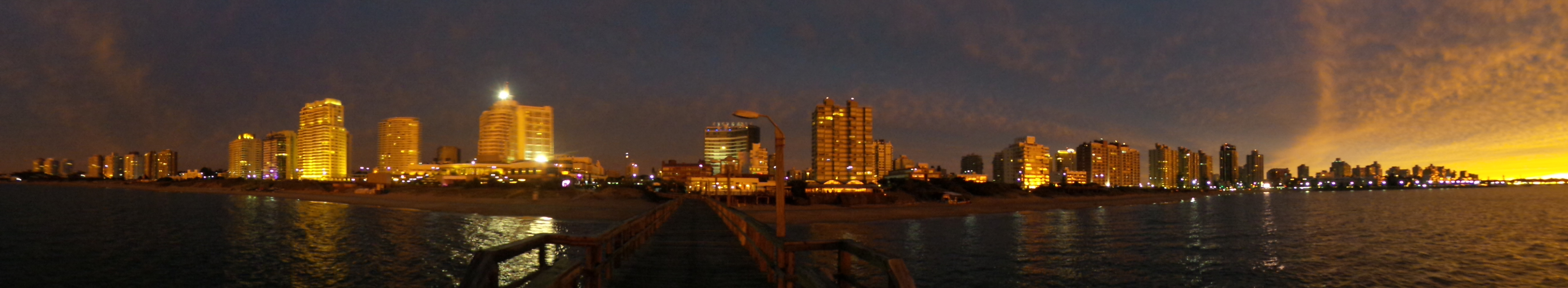
Punta del Este at dusk.
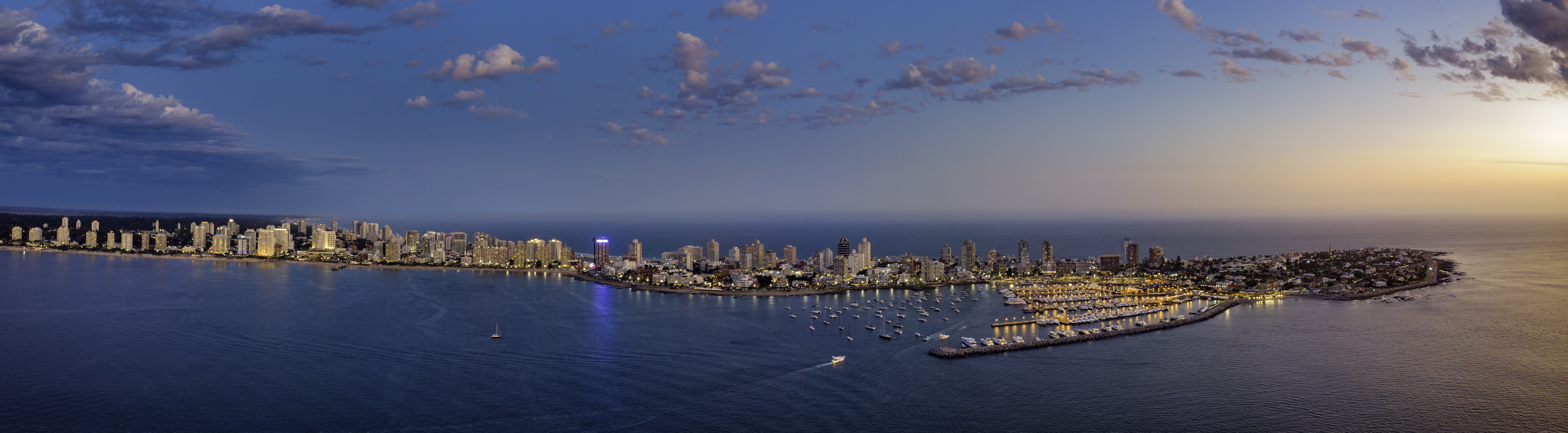
Aerial view of Punta del Este.

== Coastline ==
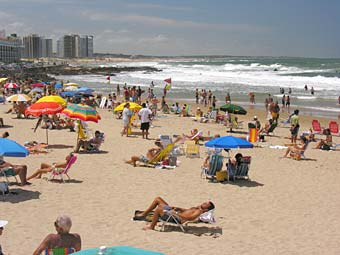
Playa El Emir.

Punta del Este's scenic coastline is divided in two regions: Brava (Spanish: "fierce") and Mansa ("tame"). The limit between the two marks the end of the Río de la Plata and the beginning of the Atlantic Ocean. Beaches on the Mansa side feature thick and golden sand, while on the Brava side the sand is white and fine. Every beach of the peninsula has public access.

La Barra is popular for nautical sports and fishing during the day. At later hours, La Barra becomes a central attraction for the younger generation. Starting from the end of December through to the second week of January, this location becomes a place for the local people as well as tourists to gather at the night life festivities. Other areas include the resort of El Tesoro, Montoya beach, Bikini beach and Manantiales beach. These beaches are a favourite spot for younger people as well as for many celebrities from both Uruguay and Argentina.

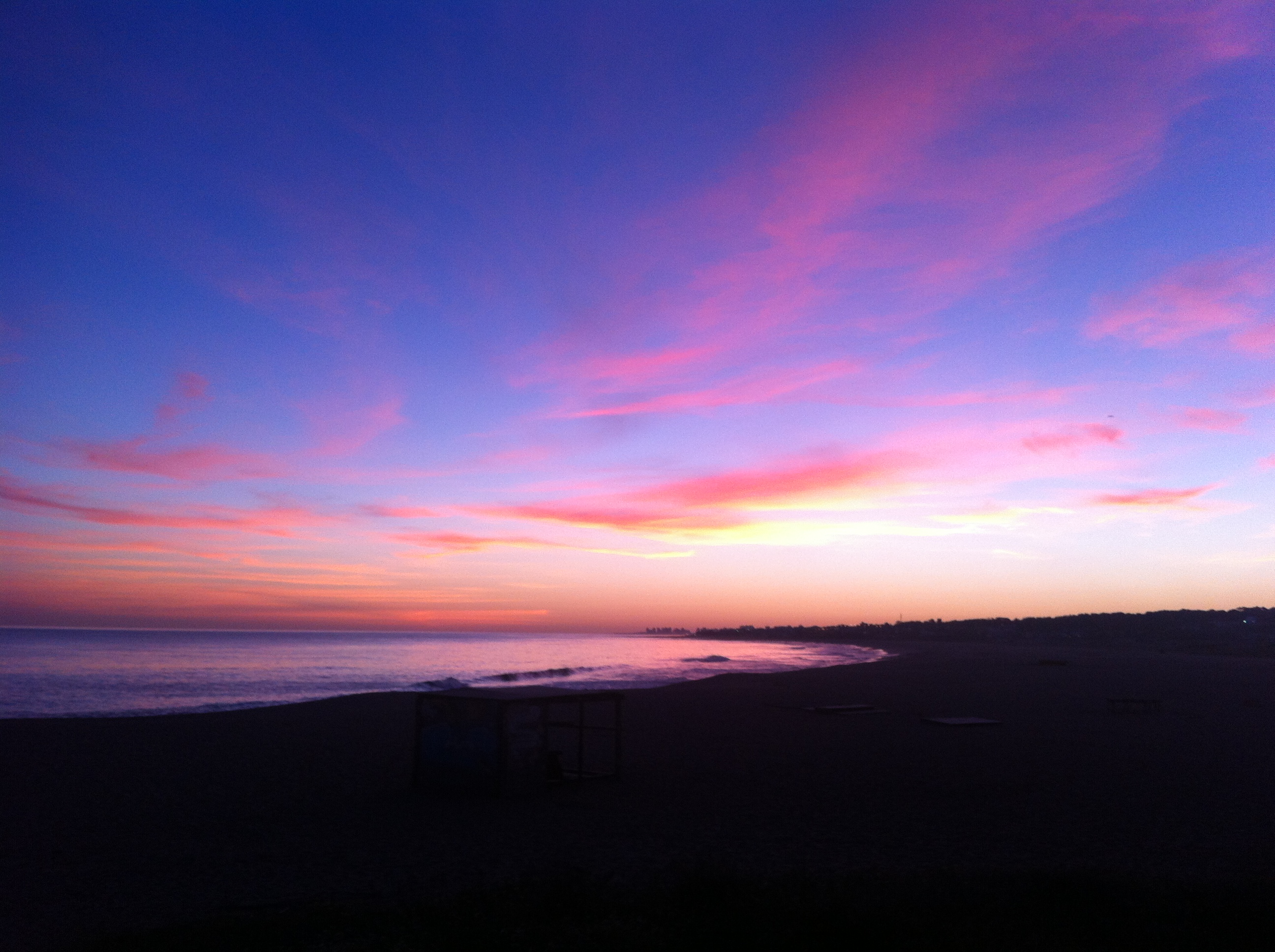
Manantiales Beach at the sunset

Once abundant, southern right whales are re-colonizing in the area, which helped create a whale sanctuary off Latin America, whose establishment had been prevented for near a decade by whaling nations like Japan. Unlike the majority of Uruguayan coasts, appearances of orcas have been documented in the area; most notably around Isla de Lobos.

== Landmarks ==
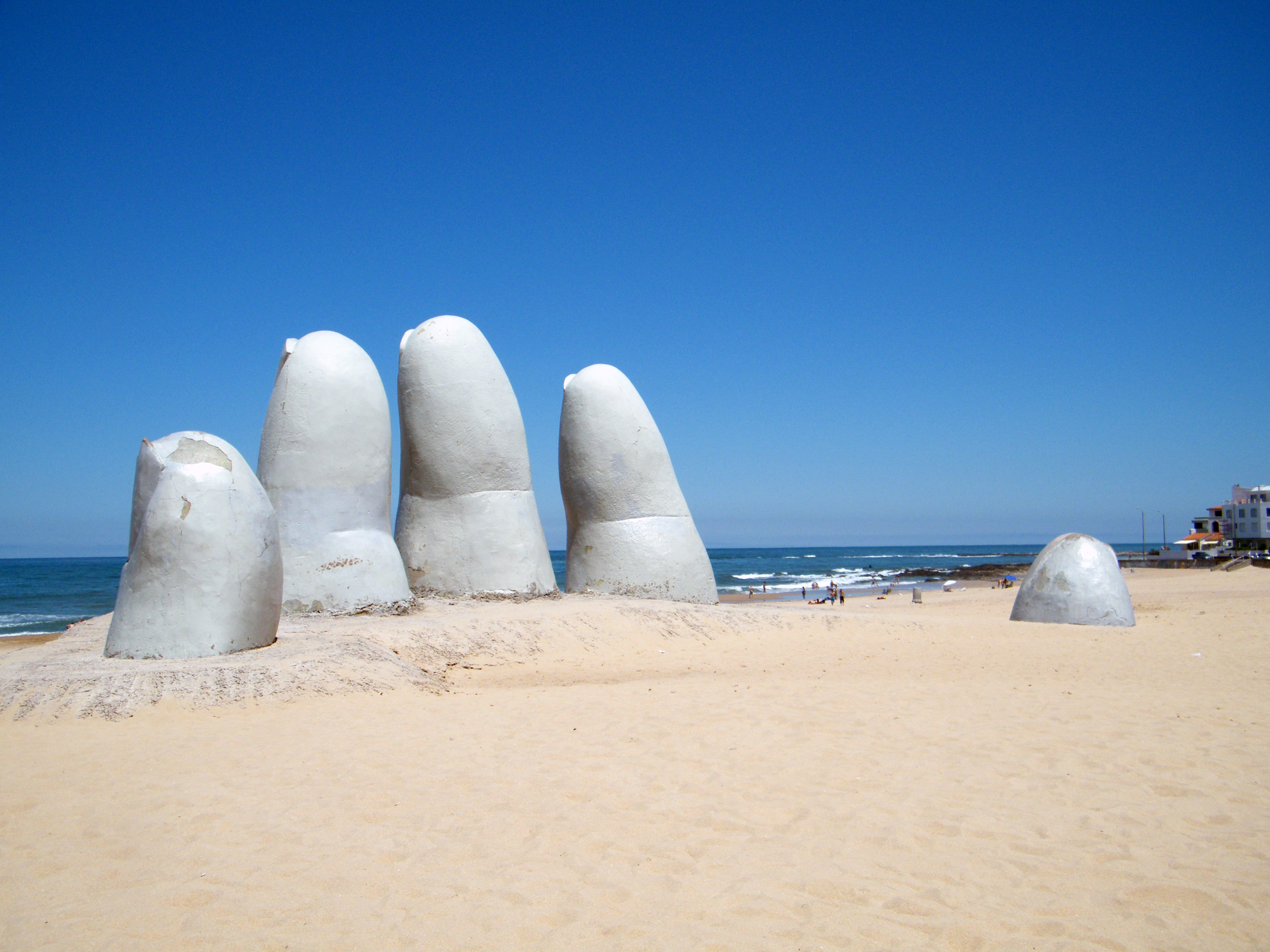
The fingers of Punta del Este.

The city has much colonial architecture contrasting with more modern buildings. Nowadays it has a scenic shore, typical resort houses, modern buildings, a port with mooring capacity, department stores, restaurants, and pubs. There are several large houses, and gardens lined with plants.

Gorlero Avenue, the main avenue of Punta del Este has commercial galleries, restaurants, cinemas, casinos, shops.

Artigas square on Gorlero Ave is the place where there is a popular handicraft market.

An iconic and historic building rises on the 19th stop of the Brava Beach, the famous Hotel L'Auberge Inicio with its 70 year old water tower.

Punta del Este was originally home to the first Conrad Hotel in South America.

Punta del Este is well known for organizing the summit in which the WTO was created. The Formula E has hosted several races, broadcast worldwide, in the city, based on its "absolutely landmark cityscape". In 2017, the China-Latin America Forum took place in the Punta del Este Convention Center.

=== Enjoy Punta del Este (formerly Conrad Resort & Casino) ===
Enjoy Punta del Este (formerly Conrad Punta del Este) is a hotel and casino designed by Guillermo Gómez Platero. The hotel's construction started in 1993 and finished in 1997. It offers 294 rooms, including 41 luxury suites. It was originally operated by Hilton Hotels & Resorts under the brand "Conrad". The property was owned by Caesars Entertainment Corporation and Hilton Hotels & Resorts until it was sold to the Chilean group Enjoy S.A. in 2017. Hilton's affiliation ceased on April 1, 2018.

The casino hosted the partypoker Latin American Poker Championships (LAPC) which lasted between February 24 and March 4, 2018, and had an attendance of 1,137 players.

=== Fundación Pablo Atchugarry ===
One of the leading artistic institutions of Uruguay, the Fundación Pablo Atchugarry (Pablo Atchugarry Foundation) is dedicated to the promotion of arts and culture in Punta del Este. The foundation was created in 2007 by international sculpture artist Pablo Atchugarry, with the aim to keep a dialogue between art and nature. During the summer season (December to February) the foundation proposes a series of exhibitions and events such as concerts of lyrical to popular music, ballet representations and more. Once a year, the institution present an iconic exhibition from a major artist or collection. Over the past five years, the works of František Kupka, Le Corbusier, Collection MACBA, José Gurvich and Pablo Atchugarry have been exhibited in the main building. The premises of the institution are composed of the sculptor's workshop, a building with three exhibition rooms, an auditorium, an open-air stage for a variety of shows, a restaurant, a didactic room where sculpture, painting, drawing and ceramic classes are held, and finally a space which holds the permanent collection and the work of the founder. A 30-hectare sculpture park surrounds the compound.

=== Punta del Este Lighthouse ===
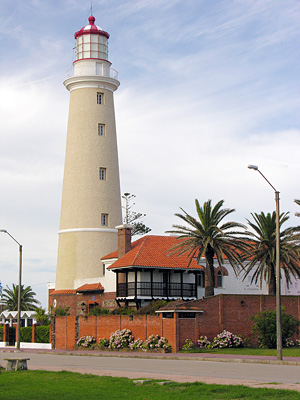
Lighthouse of Punta del Este

The lighthouse is 45 metres tall, and the crystal panels which are part of its illumination system were brought from France. It works by electricity, with acetylene gas as emergency backup. It is possible to climb the 150 steps of its spiral staircase.

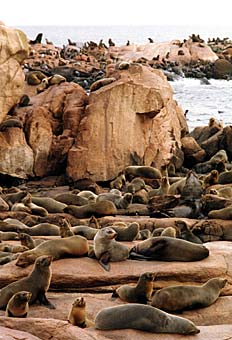
Sea lions on Isla de Lobos (Isle of Wolves)

=== Gorriti Island ===
This island of 21 hectares of surface is daily visited to enjoy its two beaches: Garden Port and Honda beach. It consists of a natural port, with ships anchoring close to it, and it also became a popular area to practice water sports.

== Transportation ==
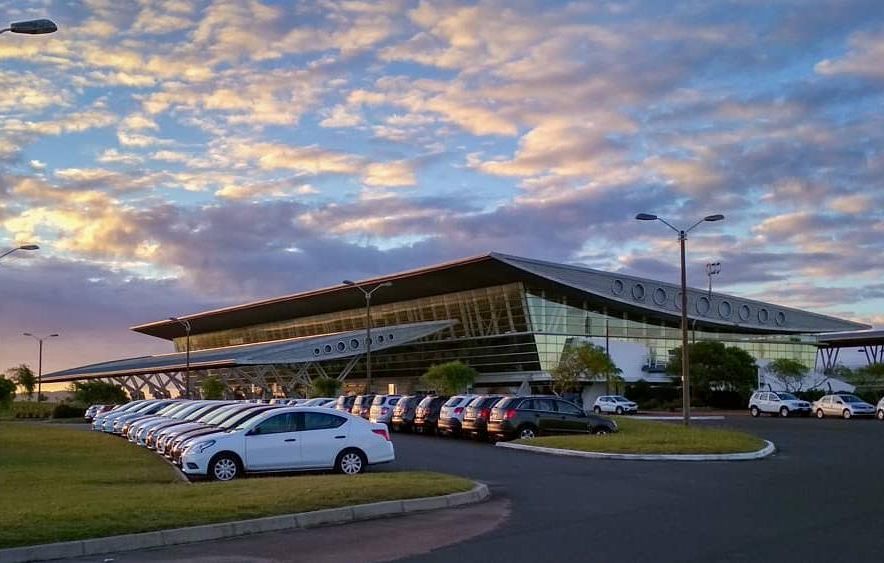
Capitán de Corbeta Carlos A. Curbelo International Airport.

The city is served by Capitán de Corbeta Carlos A. Curbelo International Airport, being the second most important of Uruguay, located near Laguna del Sauce on the outskirts of the city. Its modern terminal, designed by Carlos Ott, was inaugurated on 19 December 1997. It offers domestic and international flights within the region.

Most international flights land in Montevideo at Carrasco International Airport, around 115 km (71 mi) from Punta del Este. The bus companies Copsa and Cot connect the airport with Punta del Este, and there are several private taxi and remise services available.

Also in the area is El Jagüel Airport, which is much closer to Punta del Este; it is only used by small-sized private aircraft.

== Places of worship ==
Punta del Este has numerous Jewish temples and Catholic churches:

- Parish Church of Our Lady of Candelaria (Roman Catholic)
- Fátima Chapel (Roman Catholic)
- St. Raphael Chapel (Roman Catholic)
- Rafael Temple (Jewish)
- Beit Yaacov (Jewish)
- Beit Jabad (Jewish-Chabad)

== Activities ==
Among its attractions, the city offers music and cinema festivals, whale sightseeing, and fine dining.

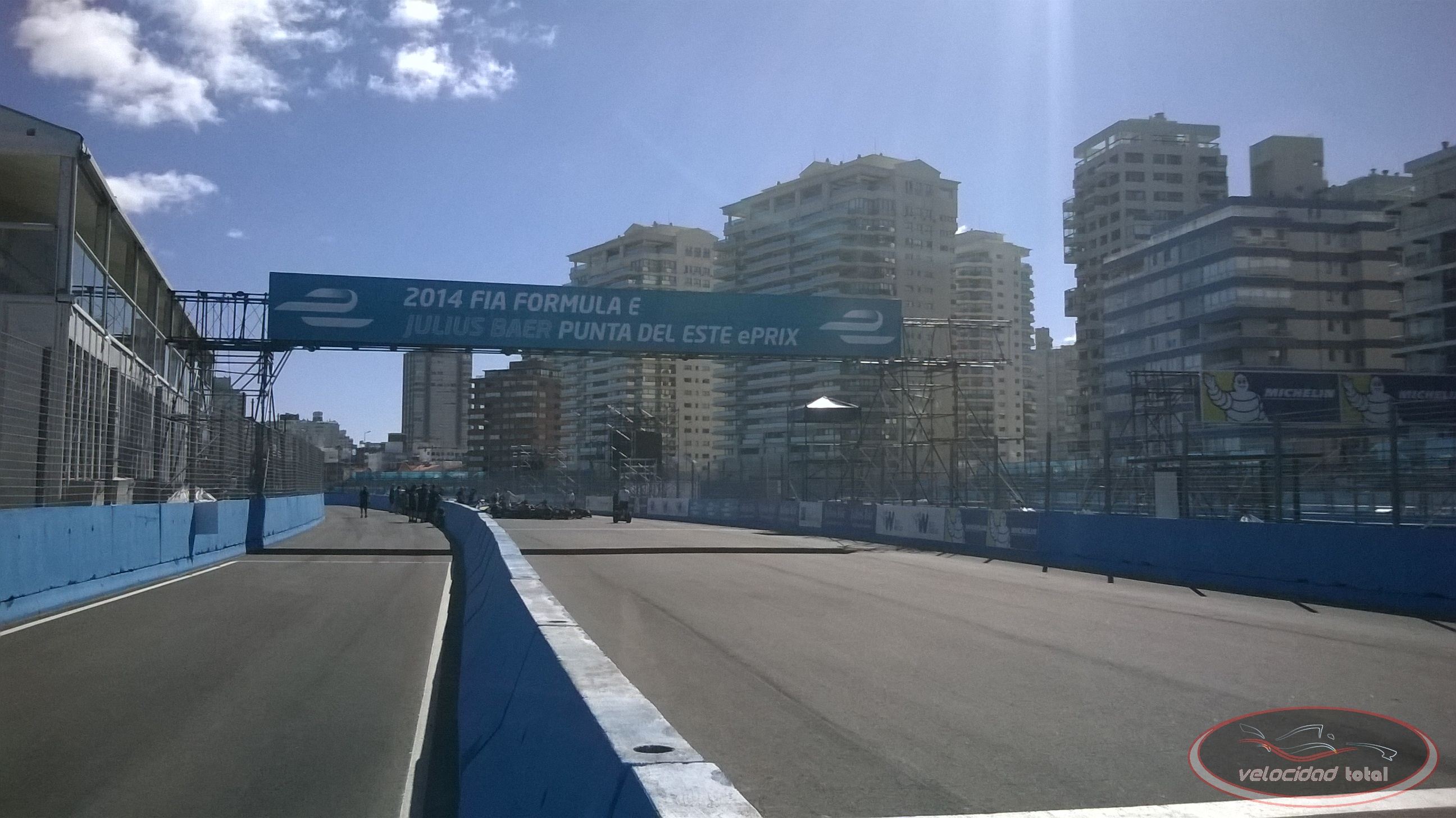
The 2014 Punta del Este ePrix was the first race of the Formula E history in the Americas.

The city hosted the Punta del Este ePrix in 2014, 2015, and 2018. The street circuit of 2.8 km of length runs along Punta del Este's harbour and has been nicknamed the Monte Carlo of South America.

The Uruguay Sevens rugby competition held in Montevideo began as Punta Del Este Sevens in 1989.

== Notable people ==
- Margaret Cooper (1918–2016), British cryptographer, born in Punta del Este
- Juan Cáceres (1984–), Uruguayan racing driver, born in Punta del Este
- Nahitan Nandez (1995–), Uruguayan football player, born in Punta del Este

== Bibliography ==
- Altman Macchio, Leonardo (2026). La construcción del boom. Turismo, territorio y escalas en Maldonado-Punta del Este (1974-1982) (in Spanish). Montevideo: CSIC-Udelar. p. 144.
