= Beit Jabad, Montevideo =

Orthodox synagogue in Montevideo, Uruguay

Beit Jabad
- Location of the synagogue in Montevideo

Religion
- Affiliation: Hasidic Judaism
- Rite: Nusach Ashkenaz
- Ecclesiastical or organisational status: Synagogue
- Status: Active

Location
- Location: Pocitos, Montevideo
- Country: Uruguay
- Coordinates: 34°54′28″S 56°08′25″W

Website
- jabad.org.uy

Beit Jabad is a Hasidic Jewish congregation and synagogue, located in the neighbourhood of Pocitos, in Montevideo, Uruguay. The synagogue is administered by Beit Jabad, a Chabad organisation.

== See also ==
- History of the Jews in Uruguay
- List of synagogues in Uruguay
