= Nuestra Señora de la Candelaria, Punta del Este =

Church in Punta del Este, Uruguay

Coordinates: 34°58′08″S 54°57′01″W

Iglesia de Nuestra Señora de la Candelaria
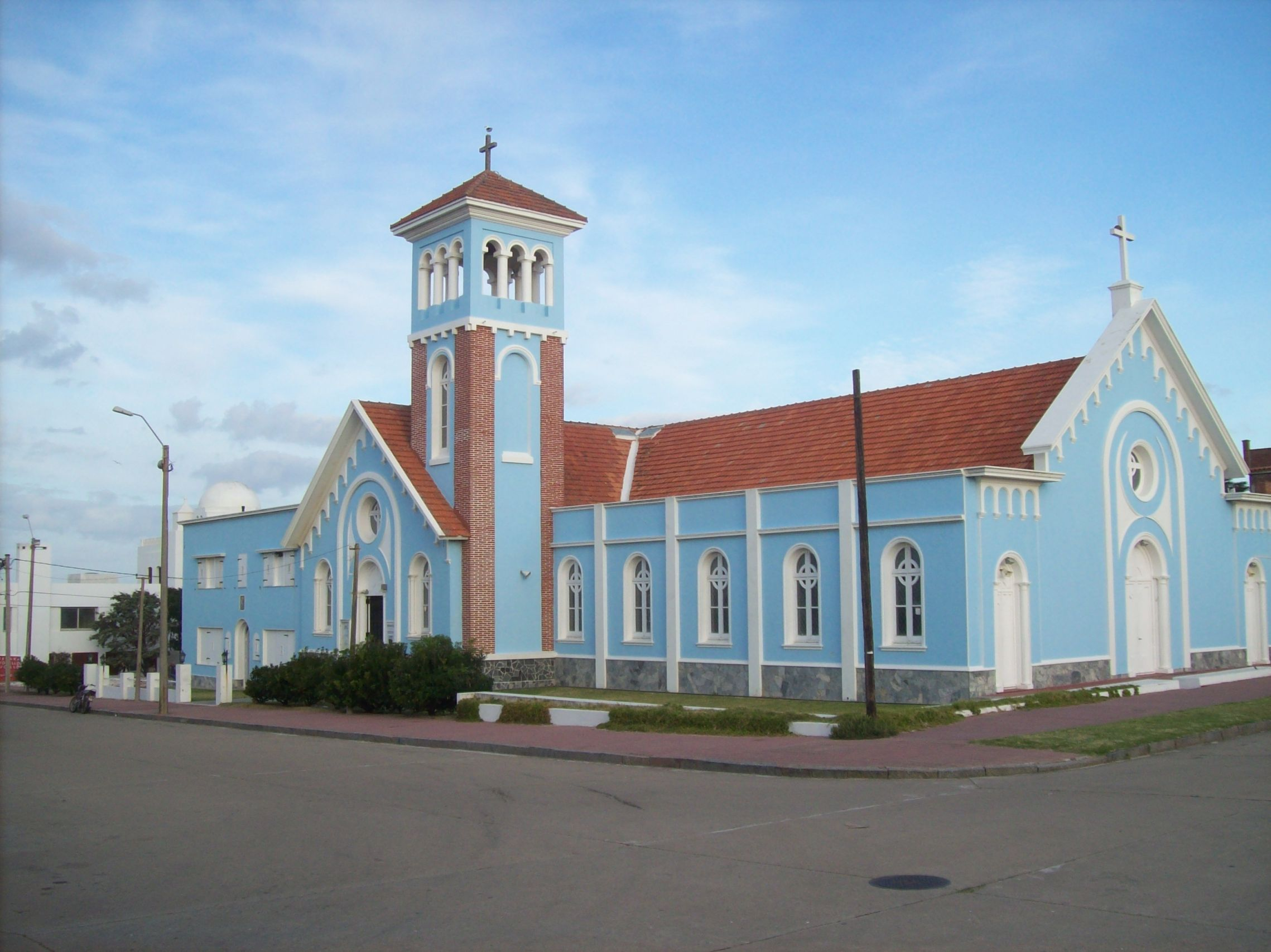

Religion
- Affiliation: Roman Catholic
- Ecclesiastical or organisational status: Parish church

Location
- Location: Punta del Este, Uruguay
- Interactive map of Iglesia de Nuestra Señora de la Candelaria

Architecture
- Type: Church

The Church of Our Lady of Candelaria (Spanish: Iglesia de Nuestra Señora de la Candelaria) is a Roman Catholic parish church in Punta del Este, Uruguay.

The parish was established 1 February 1948.

The first temple was built in 1911. The current building dates from the mid-20th century. It is dedicated to the Virgin of Candelaria.
