= Ajdut Israel Synagogue =

Orthodox synagogue in Punta del Este, Uruguay

- Spanish: Sinagoga Ajdut Israel
- Location of the synagogue in southern Uruguay

Religion
- Affiliation: Hasidic Judaism
- Rite: Nusach Ashkenaz
- Ecclesiastical or organisational status: Synagogue
- Status: Active

Location
- Location: Punta del Este, Maldonado Department
- Country: Uruguay
- Coordinates: 34°56′01″S 54°56′52″W

Website
- jabad.org.uy

The Ajdut Israel Synagogue (Spanish: Sinagoga Ajdut Israel) is a Hasidic Jewish synagogue, located in Punta del Este, in the Maldonado Department, of southeastern Uruguay. The synagogue is administered by Beit Jabad, a Chabad organisation.

== See also ==
- History of the Jews in Uruguay
- List of synagogues in Uruguay
