= Lobos Island (Maldonado) =

Island in Uruguay

Isla de Lobos
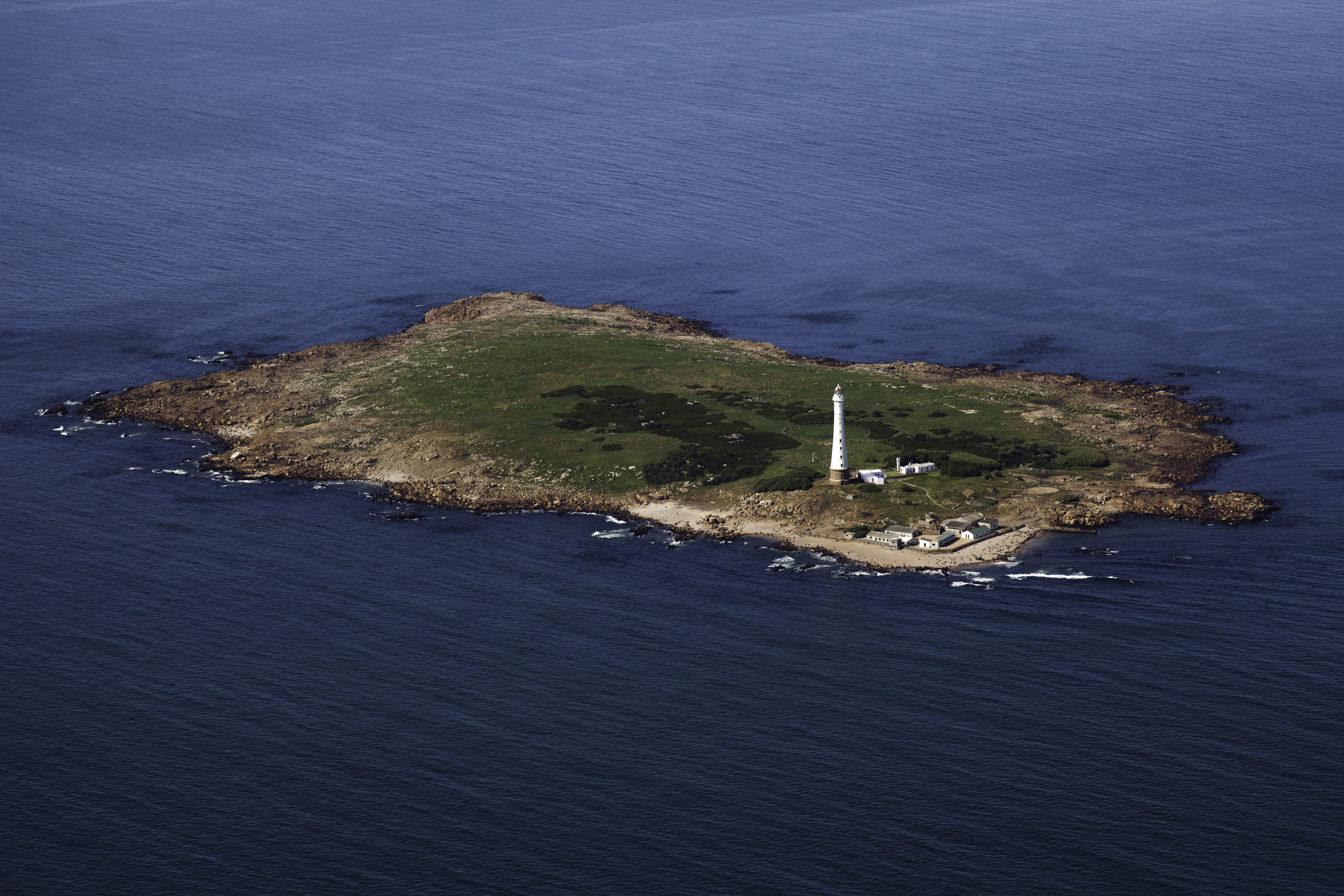
- Aerial view of the island

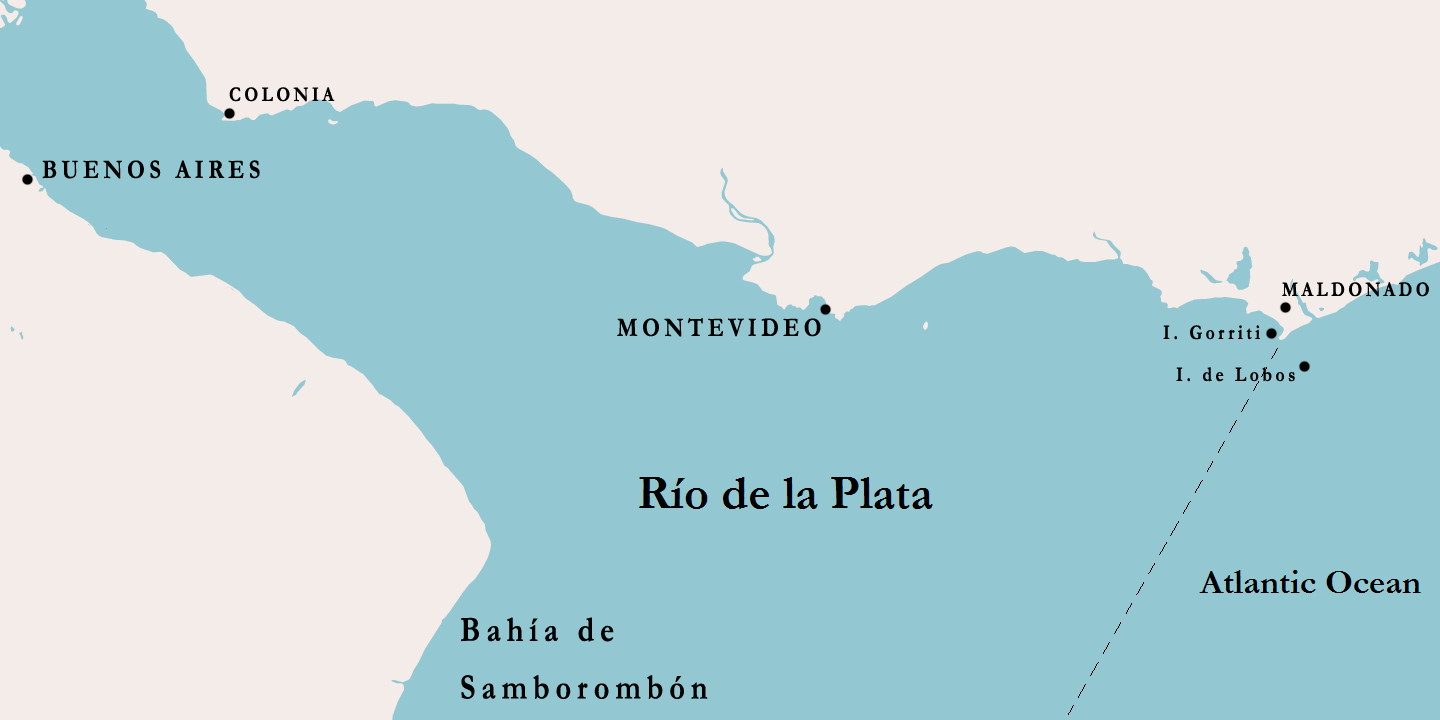

Geography
- Location: Atlantic Ocean
- Coordinates: 35°03′01″S 54°52′27″W
- Total islands: 2
- Area: 0.435 km^{2} (0.168 sq mi)
- Highest elevation: 26 m (85 ft)

Administration
- Uruguay
- Department: Maldonado
- Part of: Coastal Islands National Park
- Administered by: Ministry of Livestock, Agriculture and Fisheries

The Lobos Island (Spanish: Isla de Lobos) is a small island located about 8 kilometres (5.0 mi) southeast of Punta del Este (Uruguay) in the Atlantic Ocean. An islet lies east of the island.

Since 2024 it makes up the Island and Islet of Lobos and their Submerged Environment National Park a marine protected area.

== Geography ==
The island is an outcropping of rocks as a continuation of the Cuchilla Grande, in an area of the Atlantic Ocean immediately at the mouth (outer limit) of the estuary of Río de la Plata. Administratively, it falls under the jurisdiction of the department of Maldonado, although it constitutes a natural reserve. Somewhat to the northwest is the smaller Gorriti Island which is the second most southerly place in Uruguay.

Isla de Lobos was exploited economically until 1992. Hunting the island's marine life was prohibited by law in 1991. Today it constitutes a nature reserve that is integrated into the "Coastal Islands National Park" administered by the Ministry of Livestock, Agriculture, and Fisheries. At 1,250 metres (4,100 ft) from the island is an uninhabited rock formation on which stands a votive chapel built in 1945 by German and Italian sailors fleeing Spain and surviving a disaster. The chapel is dedicated to Our Lady of Storms (Nuestra Señora de las Tormentas - Finita Burrasca) and gives thanks for the storm that ended. Sailors called (as early as 1957) this rock by the name of Finita Burrasca to indicate that they found safe shelter here in case of storms.

== History ==
It was first documented by Spanish navigator Juan Díaz de Solís in 1516 and named "San Sebastian de Cádiz". In 1527, it was visited by the Venetian navigator Sebastian Cabot during his expedition to the Río de la Plata and Paraná. In 1528, Diego García de Moguer sailed to the region and named it the "Island of the Snapper." In 1599, the island was visited by Laurens Bicker. Surveys conducted in 1997 revealed the presence of German navy sailors on the island along with Italian maritime personnel. There are inscriptions inside a votive chapel made of material to be attributed to German submarine use. In particular, some inscriptions in German that would refer to 1945 (July 1945) and others in Italian that read "Grazie per la Finita Burrasca" suggest mixed Italian/German personnel escaped from some safe harbor in Spain and through a long sail, running out of fuel and food, landed on this rock after self-sinking the submarine that carried them.

== Lighthouse ==
In 1858 the Uruguayan government erected a lighthouse on the island, which was rebuilt in 1906. With its height of 59 metres (194 ft) above sea level, From the balcony outside, which is accessed by 240 steps, there is a panoramic view of the island and the coast of Punta del Este. In July 2001, it became the first automated lighthouse in Uruguay, using solar energy and other new technology. It has a siren that runs on compressed air to provide an alternative signal on days of thick fog.

== Animals ==
Isla de Lobos and Gorriti Island are parts of a nature reserve, holding the largest colony of South American sea lions and South American fur seals in the western hemisphere: in 2005 there were 250,000 sea lions of the species called "two hairs" and 1,500 of the species known as the "wig." Fewer in numbers, southern elephant seals also appear around the area.

Punta del Este is one of the most famous wintering area for southern right whales in Uruguay and shore-based whale watching is becoming a popular attraction. Can also be found different types of orcas and birds.

The area is one of few areas in Uruguay where more frequent appearances of orcas have been confirmed; their prey in the area may include tunas.

== Gallery ==
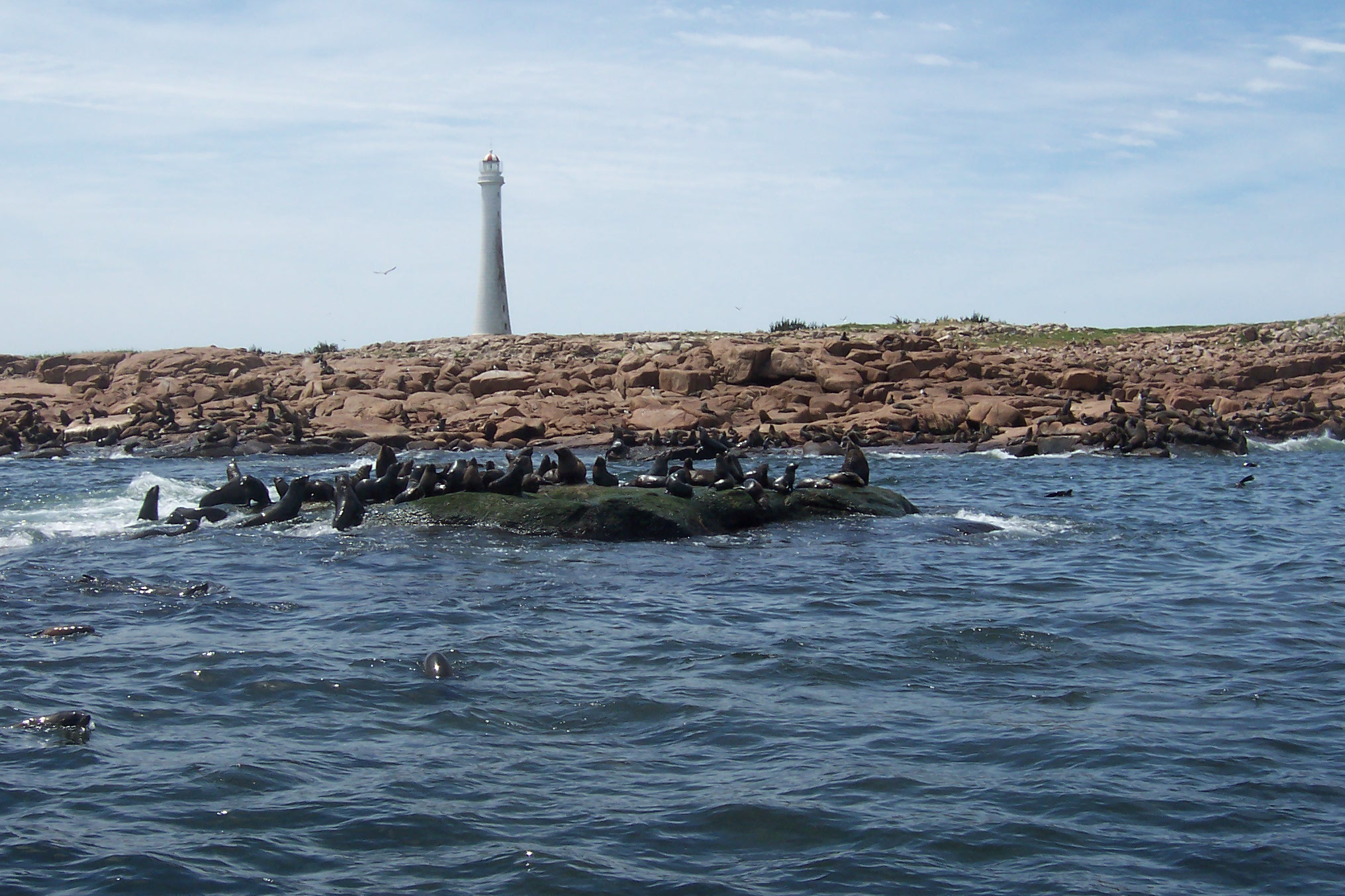

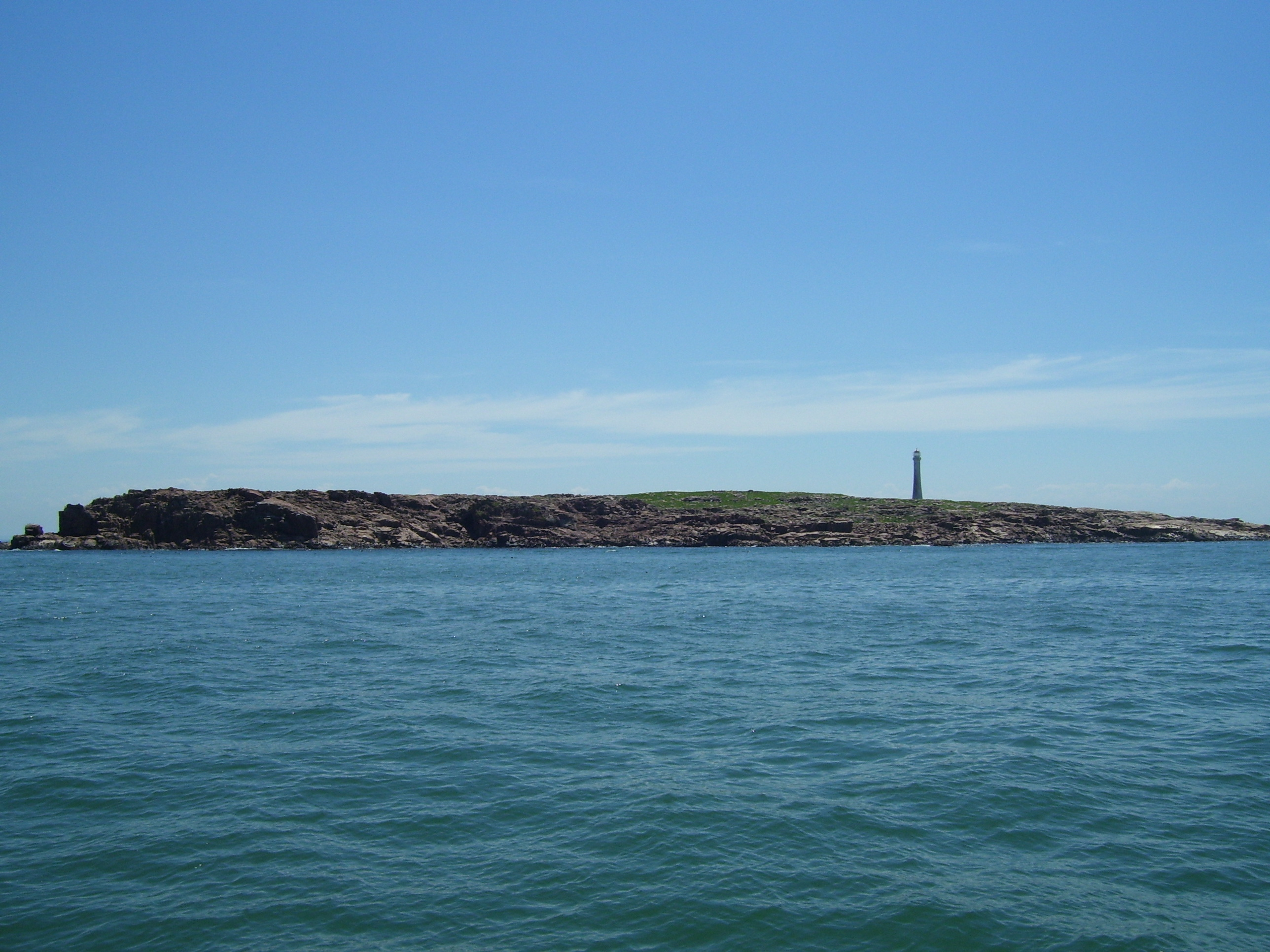

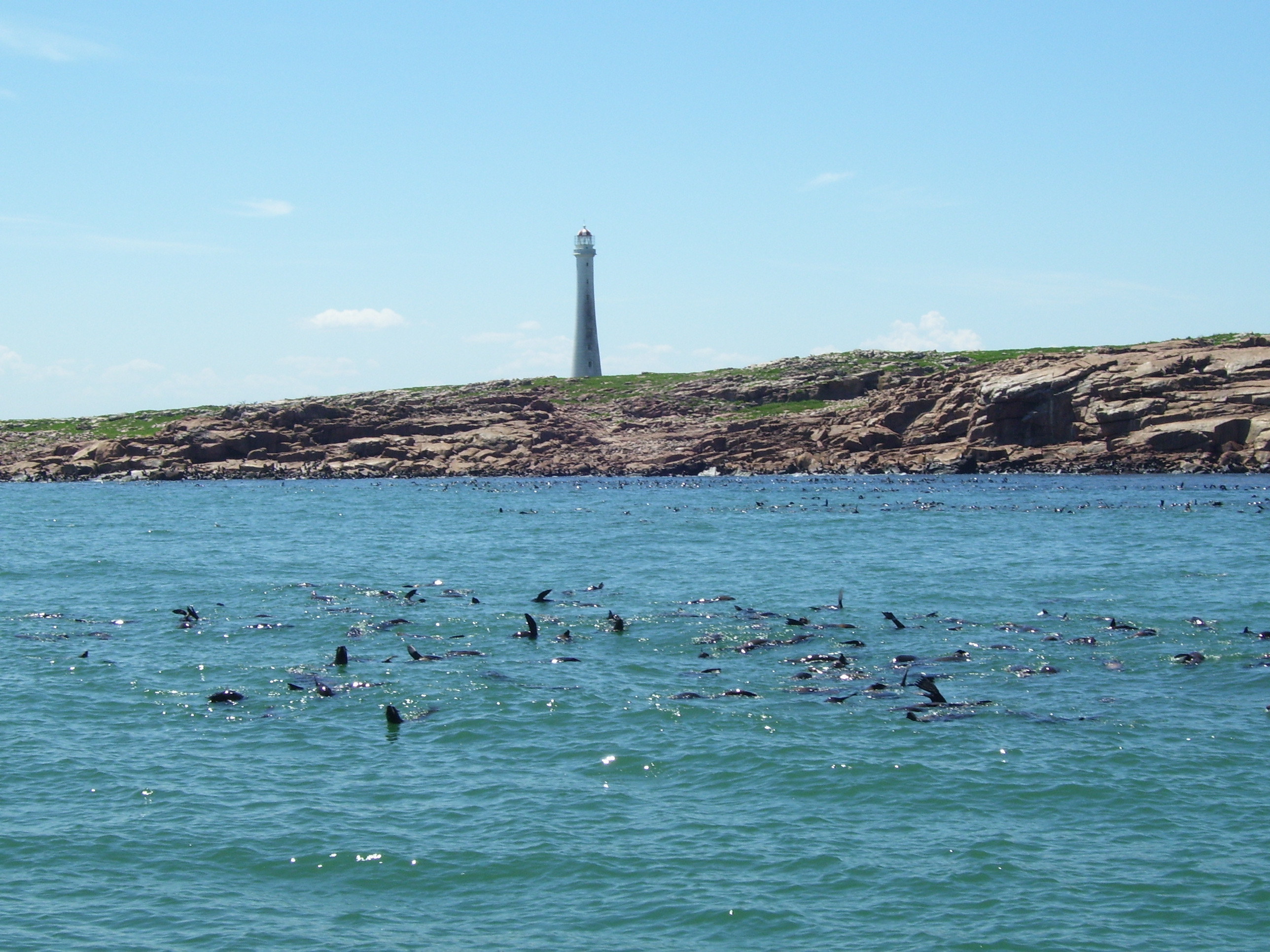

== Bibliography ==
- Páez, Enrique; de Bonis, Adela (1999), "Impacto en cachorros de lobo fino sudamericano durante el derrame de petróleo en la isla de lobos", V Jornadas de Zoología Del Uruguay (PDF) (in Spanish), Uruguay, Montevideo, archived from the original (PDF) on 2013-08-29
- Conservación y uso sustentable de la fauna marina (pdf) (in Spanish), Uruguay, Montevideo: Escuela Naval, 2002
