= Attack on the Brazilian Fort in Punta del Este =

1827 military operation during the Cisplatine War

- Part of the Cisplatine War
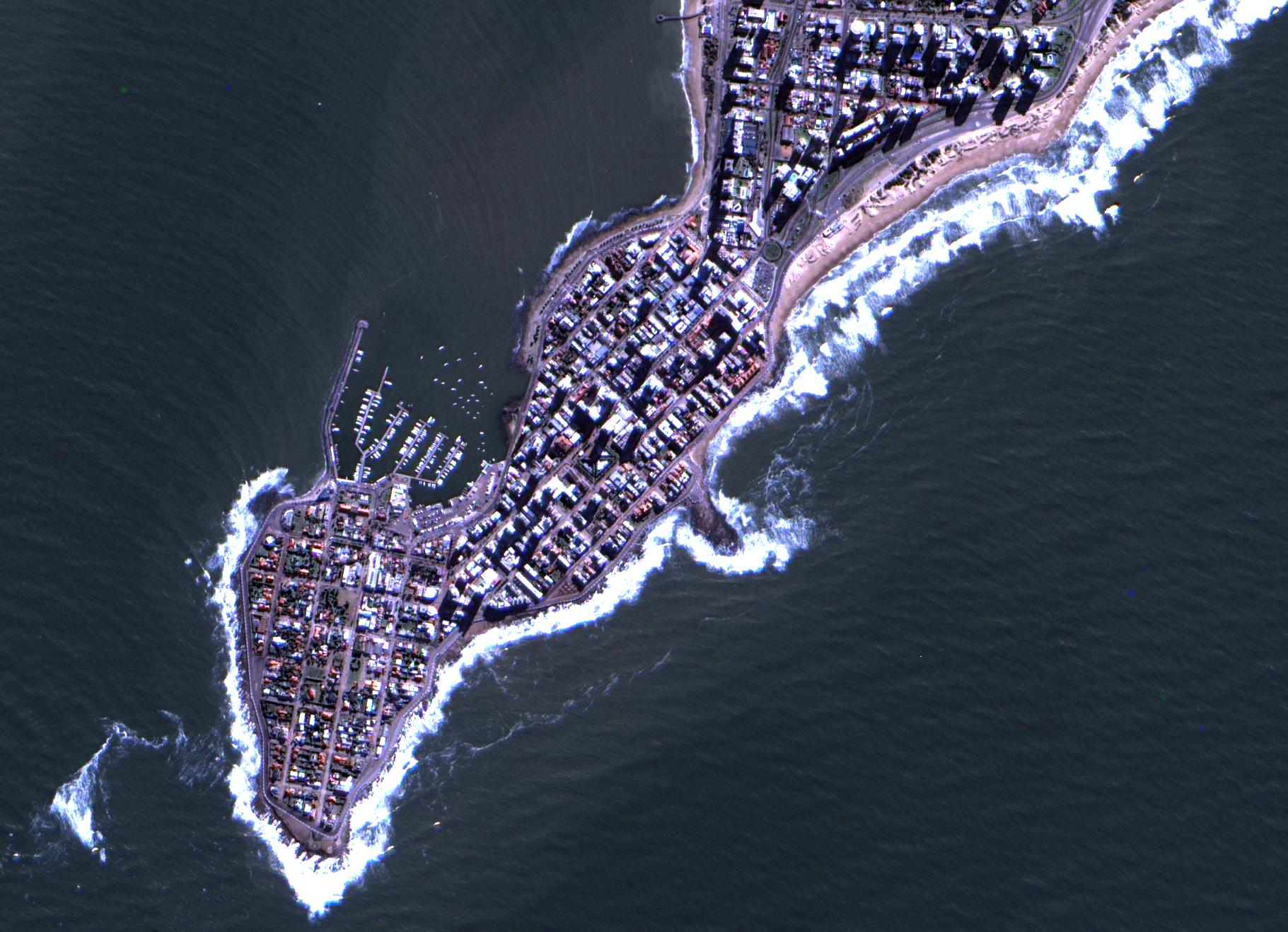
- The outpost's location is now a heavily urbanized area.
| Date | August 17–19, 1827 |
| Location | Punta del Este, Cisplatine Province (Present-day Uruguay) 34°57′41.8″S 54°56′34.8″W |
| Result | Brazilian victory |

Belligerents
| United Provinces | Empire of Brazil |

Commanders and leaders
| Juan Antonio Lavalleja; Leonardo Olivera | Salustiano Severino dos Reis (POW) |

Units involved
| 4th Active Militia Battalion of Buenos Aires; Local militamen | Brazilian garrison at Punta del Este |

Strength
| 1,113 | 240; 13 cannons |

Casualties and losses
| Unknown | Unknown |
- Location of Punta del Este in Uruguay

The Attack on the Brazilian Fort in Punta del Este was a short-lived military operation during the Cisplatine War, led by Brigadier General Juan Antonio Lavalleja. The operation took place between August 17 and 19, 1827, in the region now known as Punta del Este in Uruguay. It aimed to expel Brazilian forces stationed at a strategically constructed fort in the area.

== Background ==
The Cisplatine War (1825–1828) was fought between the Empire of Brazil and the United Provinces of the Rio de la Plata (now Argentina and Uruguay) over control of the Cisplatina province (modern-day Uruguay).

By early 1827, the Brazilian military had established an outpost in Punta del Este, a small, rocky peninsula in southern Uruguay surrounded by sand dunes. The Brazilian government of Montevideo deployed resources and personnel to the site as part of a broader campaign to maintain control of the region.

This fort, erected on the block bounded by Gorlero, 27, 24 and 25 streets, allowed a garrison of about 240 men to carry out surprise attacks to the nearby cities of Maldonado and San Carlos, which were under the control of the United Provinces. The situation improved with the return of the National Guard, commanded by Colonel Leonardo Olivera, who imposed a siege that limited Brazilian sorties to mere guerrilla attacks.

== Prelude ==
The immediate trigger for the operation was the assassination of Colonel Ventura Alegre on May 17, 1827. Alegre, a prominent officer who had served under General José de San Martín and participated in the Battle of Ituzaingó, was ambushed and killed on the streets of the nearby city of Maldonado by Brazilian troops presumably from the garrison. On the same day, they captured Lieutenant Colonel Juan Escobar. Lavalleja, outraged by this act, resolved to expel the Brazilian forces from the area.

However, another source claims that Colonel Alegre was killed by a stray bullet from a Brazilian discharge, rather than through a deliberate ambush.

Lavalleja was advised against pursuing this operation by Colonel José Brito del Pino, who opposed the idea stating that such trivial issue was beneath the rank of a general-in-chief of the army. Brito del Pino suggested entrusting the operation to Colonel Leonardo Olivera, Colonel Manuel Correa, or Colonel Isaac Thompson, head of the 4th Battalion of active militia of Buenos Aires. Notwithstanding, Lavalleja remained staunchly determined to carry out his plan and dismissed Brito del Pino's advice.

== Military operation ==
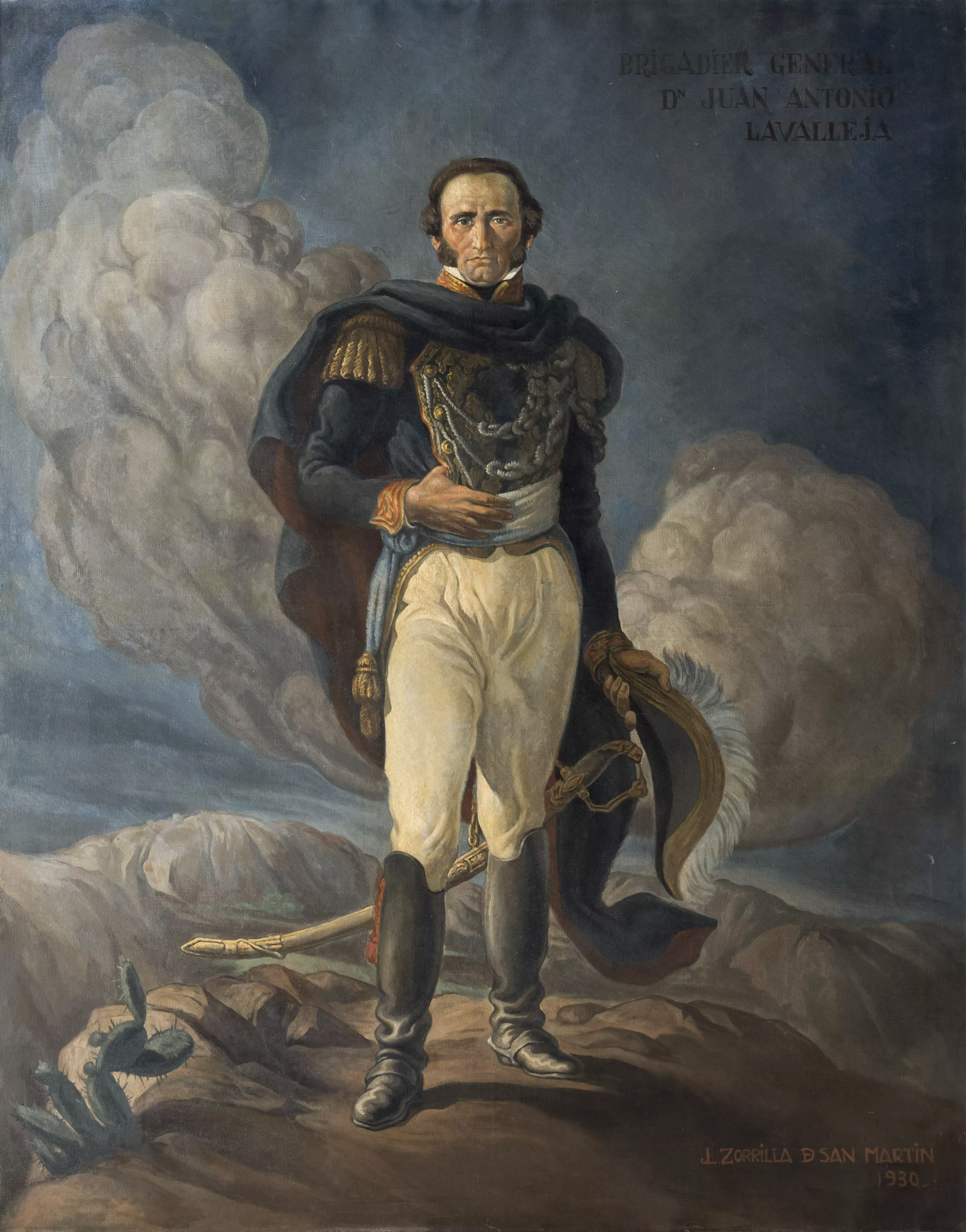
Brigadier General Juan Antonio Lavalleja, head of the operation.

=== August 16 ===
Lavalleja departed from his headquarters in Durazno with his general staff on August 11, 1827. By August 16, he arrived in Maldonado and rendezvoused with Colonel Olivera, whose forces were stationed along the Maldonado stream. That evening, Lavalleja conducted a reconnaissance of the Brazilian positions in Punta del Este returning late at night.

=== August 17 ===
The attack began at dawn with an intense exchange of gunfire and some cannon shots aimed at Colonel Olivera's cavalry. Lavalleja, along with several senior staff officers, scouted the enemy's positions while concealed by the sand dunes. After making the observations he deemed necessary, he ordered a guerrilla force of twelve mounted men to fire upon the Brazilian positions. They did so for three hours, without the Brazilians leaving their trenches surrounding their fort and responding with musket fire and grenades, at 4 P.M. the attack was called off. That night, a scouting party was sent near the Brazilian positions to search for suitable location to establish an artillery battery. No such adequate location was found and the party returned to camp at dawn.

=== August 18 ===
The militas regrouped at Colonel Olivera's camp, resupplying with food and ammunition. Two 24-pound carronades were prepared for the attack but had to be abandoned due to broken carriages. Under the cover of darkness, Lavalleja led his forces back to the dunes, positioning them near the fort for a renewed assault. Some local militiamen fired from another position in the direction of the garrison to draw their attention, and the Brazilians responded with sporadic cannon shots.

=== August 19 ===
Before dawn, some militiamen of the 4th Active Militia Battalion of Buenos Aires, against explicit orders, opened fire on the fort after spotting musket fire. This premature action alerted the Brazilian defenders, who launched flares to expose the attackers. A fierce firefight ensued, with the Brazilians employing grapeshot and cannon fire from both the peninsula and another position located on Gorriti Island. The militia's lack of discipline (made up of blacks and mulattos unaccustomed to warfare) led to their panicked routing, leaving only the more disciplined cavalry unit to maintain the assault. Lavalleja was forced to withdraw. Cries of Viva o Imperador! (Long live the Emperor!) were heard from the Brazilian soldiers as the cavalry retreated. After regrouping his battalion in the nearby city of Maldonado, Lavalleja chose to abandon the operation entirely.

== Aftermath ==
On August 20, following the failed assault, Lavalleja remained in Maldonado sending reports to the Ministry of War about the failure, attributed to the lack of experienced officers in the 4th Battalion (requesting commanders who were not of the same “class” of soldiers). Colonel Severino, the Brazilian commander, was taken prisoner on August 22 on his way to Montevideo when the ship carrying him was intercepted by corsairs responding to the United Provinces government.

The Brazilian fort remained operational until the end of the Cisplatine War. The 1828 Treaty of Montevideo, specifically Article 13, stipulated the withdrawal of Brazilian forces and required Brazil to relinquish Montevideo, Colonia, and other occupied territories, including the small garrison at Punta del Este.
