= Ben-Tzion Spitz =

Chief Rabbi of Uruguay

Former Chief Rabbi Ben-Tzion Spitz

Personal life
- Born: Ben-Tzion Spitz; 1969 (age 56–57) Queens, New York, U.S.
- Spouse: Tamara Tocker Spitz
- Parent(s): Elliot and Nira Spitz
- Education: Yeshivat Har Etzion, Yeshiva University, Columbia University
- Website: ben-tzion.com

Religious life
- Religion: Judaism
- Denomination: Orthodox

Jewish leader
- Position: Former Chief Rabbi
- Organisation: Kehila of Uruguay
- Began: 1 May 2013
- Ended: 12 October 2016
- Residence: Montevideo, Uruguay
- Semikhah: Yeshivat Pirchei Shoshanim

Rabbi Ben-Tzion Spitz (born 1969) was the Chief Rabbi of Uruguay. He was born in Queens, New York, United States. In May 2013 he was appointed as Chief Rabbi of Uruguay, a position he held until October 2016.

== Early life and education ==
Ben-Tzion was born in Queens, New York, U.S. in 1969, the son of Elliot and Nira Spitz. His father is an international commodities trader and his mother is an artist.

The family moved for the father's business assignments. Ben-Tzion spent formative years of his childhood in Caracas, Venezuela and in Rio de Janeiro, Brazil where he learned to speak Spanish and Portuguese.

Spitz attended Yeshiva University High School for Boys in Manhattan from 1983 to 1986. Spitz learned at Yeshivat Kerem B'Yavneh from 1986 to 1988 and after moving to Israel in 1997 was an ongoing student and lecturer at Yeshivat Har Etzion from 1997 until 2013. He studied with Yeshivat Pirchei Shoshanim since 2007 and received his rabbinic ordination from them in 2010.

Spitz obtained a BA from Yeshiva University in 1990 and a MS from Columbia University in Mechanical Engineering in 1992. He is also a Certified Energy Manager receiving his certification from the Association of Energy Engineers in 2012.

== Career ==
After graduate school, Spitz worked as a Nuclear Engineer for Raytheon. Thereafter he held a number of business and technical positions for companies in the United States and in Israel, including as CEO of technology start-up Nanolayers and Managing Director of energy technology consultancy Hillpoint Energy.

== Writings ==
Spitz has written much Biblical Fiction, weaving new stories based on the ancient text, but strongly inspired and in line with the Jewish Orthodox tradition. He has posted an entire series of short stories based on the weekly reading of the Torah. He has also posted a fictional series based on the biblical stories of Joshua, Ehud and Ruth. Valiant Publishing has published two collections of his short stories, Destiny's Call: Book One - Genesis, and Destiny's Call: Book Two - Exodus.
