= Templo Rafael, Punta del Este =

Synagogue in Punta del Este, Uruguay

Templo Rafael
- Spanish: Templo Rafael
- Location of the synagogue in southern Uruguay

Religion
- Affiliation: Judaism
- Rite: Nusach Sefard
- Ecclesiastical or organizational status: Synagogue
- Status: Active

Location
- Location: Capitán Miranda Street (calle 7), Punta del Este, Maldonado Department
- Country: Uruguay
- Interactive map of Templo Rafael
- Coordinates: 34°58′02″S 54°57′10″W

The Rafael Temple (Spanish: Templo Rafael) is a Jewish congregation and synagogue, located on Capitán Miranda Street (calle 7), in Punta del Este, in the Maldonado Department, of southeastern Uruguay. It is the oldest synagogue in Punta del Este.

== See also ==
- History of the Jews in Uruguay
- List of synagogues in Uruguay
