= Uruguayan Jewish Community =

Jewish congregation in Montevideo

Synagogue of the Uruguayan Jewish Community
- Spanish: Sinagoga de la Comunidad Israelita del Uruguay
- Location of the synagogue in Montevideo

Religion
- Affiliation: Judaism
- Rite: Nusach Ashkenaz
- Ecclesiastical or organisational status: Synagogue
- Leadership: Chief Rabbi Ben-Tzion Spitz
- Status: Active

Location
- Location: Punta Carretas, Montevideo
- Country: Uruguay
- Coordinates: 34°55′14″S 56°09′25″W

Architecture
- Completed: 2025

Website
- kehila.org.uy

The Synagogue of the Uruguayan Jewish Community (Spanish: Comunidad Israelita del Uruguay), also known as Kehilá is a Jewish congregation and synagogue, located in the Punta Carretas neighbourhood of Montevideo, Uruguay.

== Overview ==
The Ashkenazi Jewish community settled in Montevideo in the first decades of the 20th century. First they had a small temple located at Durazno street. Afterwards a more modern temple opened its doors in 1981. That building in the Centro neighborhood operated until 2024; that year, it was acquired by the Margarita Xirgu Multidisciplinary School of Dramatic Art.

The current building is located in Punta Carretas. The services are conducted by Chief Rabbi Ben-Tzion Spitz.

== See also ==
- History of the Jews in Uruguay
- List of synagogues in Uruguay
