= Vaad Ha'ir Synagogue =

Synagogue in Montevideo, Uruguay

- Spanish: Sinagoga Vaad Ha'ir

Religion
- Affiliation: Judaism
- Ecclesiastical or organisational status: Synagogue
- Status: Active

Location
- Location: Centro, Montevideo
- Country: Uruguay
- Interactive map of Vaad Ha'ir Synagogue

Architecture
- Established: c. 1940s (as a congregation)
- Groundbreaking: 1944
- Completed: 1948

The Vaad Ha'ir Synagogue (Spanish: Sinagoga Vaad Ha'ir) is a Jewish congregation and synagogue, located in the Centro neighbourhood of Montevideo, Uruguay.

The construction of this temple started in 1944, it was consecrated in 1948. It used to have a rich religious life during its first decades.

== See also ==
- History of the Jews in Uruguay
- List of synagogues in Uruguay
