= List of synagogues in Uruguay =

This is a list of synagogues in Uruguay.

== Montevideo ==
- Sephardic Jewish Community
- Uruguayan Jewish Community in Punta Carretas
  - Former synagogue of the Uruguayan Jewish Community (1981-2024) in downtown Montevideo
- New Jewish Congregation
- Vaad Ha'ir
- Yavne
- Beit Jabad
- Adat Israel
- Anshei Yeshurun
- Pocitos Sephardic Temple
- Or Israel - Yeshivá Uruguay

== Punta del Este ==
The main seaside resort on the Atlantic has a rich Jewish religious life, with three synagogues:

- Rafael Temple
- Beit Yaacov
- Beit Jabad

== Paysandú ==
- Sociedad Israelita de Paysandú

== See also ==
- History of the Jews in Uruguay
