= B'nai Jacob =

B'nai Jacob (Hebrew: "Sons of Jacob") may refer to the following Jewish synagogues:

- Congregation B'nai Jacob (Woodbridge, Connecticut)
- B'nai Jacob Synagogue (Ottumwa, Iowa), listed on the National Register of Historic Places (NRHP)
- B'nai Jacob Synagogue (Middletown, Pennsylvania), NRHP-listed
- B'nai Jacob Synagogue (Charleston, West Virginia)
- Congregation B'nai Jacob (Pueblo, Colorado)
