= Lists of chief rabbis =

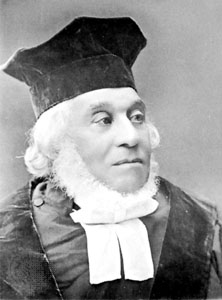
Nathan Marcus Adler Chief Rabbi of the British Empire from 1845 to 1890

Lists of Chief Rabbis cover Chief Rabbis, the leaders of the Jewish community in each country. The position is often defined by the country's secular authorities, and may also apply to leaders of the Jewish community in a given city. There may be separate Ashkenazi and Sephardi Chief Rabbis, representing the two main cultural divisions of the Jewish diaspora. There is an overall worldwide list, and specialized lists.

== Lists ==
- List of Chief Rabbis by country/region, worldwide
- List of Chief Rabbis of Iran
- List of Chief Rabbis of the United Hebrew Congregations, United Kingdom
- List of Chief Rabbis of Israel
- Chief Rabbi of Jerusalem
