= Lussich Arboretum =

Arboretum in Uruguay

Coordinates: 34°53′0″S 55°2′8″W

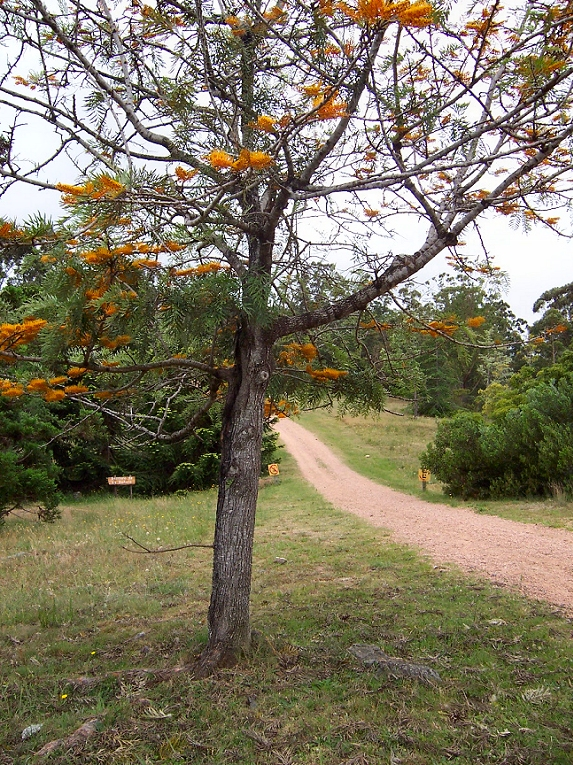
Arboretum Lussich

The Lussich Arboretum is an arboretum of 192 hectares (470 acres) located in the Maldonado Department of Uruguay near Punta del Este and Punta Ballena.

== History ==
On 5 October 1896 Antonio Lussich bought a terrain of 4,447 acres (1,800 ha), which extend from "Arroyo el Potrero" to "Sierra de la Ballena" and from Rio de la Plata to Laguna del Sauce, land which at that time consisted only of sand dunes and stones. The next year Antonio Lussich started the forestry works which had as objective on one hand, to forest the dry lands in an attempt to stop the high winds that came from the ocean, and on the other, once the forest was established, to encourage birds to inhabit it. In order to do that, Antonio Lussich, thanks to the enterprise of maritime rescue contracts obtained all over the world, could manage to get seeds from numerous continents. He bought seeds, plants and trees from around the world and planted them around his house. The first trees planted were Tamarix, sea pines, Eucalyptus and Acacia trinervis to resist the strong winds and sand.

During December 1979, 182 hectares (450 acres) was donated to the Municipality of Maldonado and then opened to the public. The Lussich Arboretum is one of the most important Forest Reserves in the world.

== Species ==
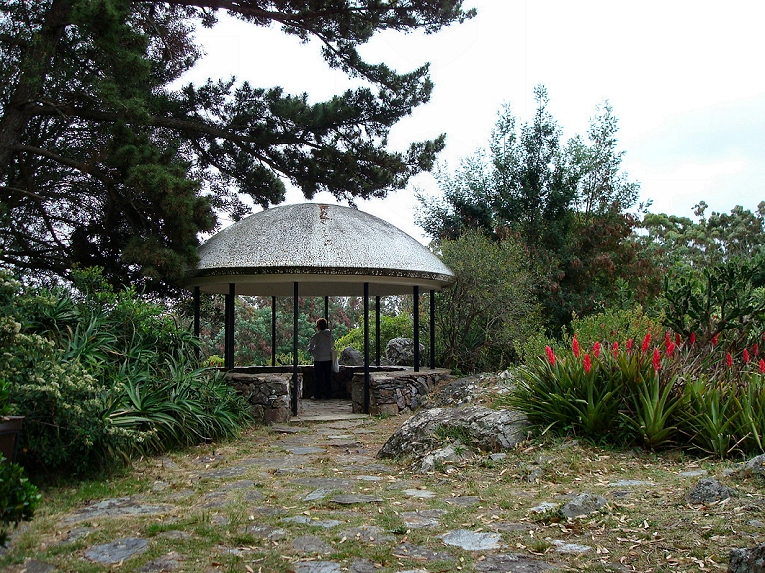
Arboretum Lussich Observatory

The Lussich Arboretum has more than 400 exotic species and around 70 Uruguayan species.

Between many of the trees species, the most important are:

- Abies, 6 species.
- Acacia, 8 species.
- Cupressus, 9 species.
- Eucalyptus, 45 species.
- Juniperus, 10 species.
- Pinus, 20 species.
- Quercus, 16 species.
- Thuja, 4 species.

== See also ==
- Antonio Lussich
