= Beit Yaacov Synagogue, Punta del Este =

Synagogue in Punta del Este, Uruguay

Beit Yaacov Synagogue
- Spanish: Sinagoga Beit Yaacov
- Location of the synagogue in southern Uruguay

Religion
- Affiliation: Judaism
- Rite: Nusach Sefard
- Ecclesiastical or organizational status: Synagogue
- Leadership: Rabbi Ezequiel Zaed
- Status: Active

Location
- Location: Calle Riso, Punta del Este, Maldonado Department
- Country: Uruguay
- Interactive map of Beit Yaacov Synagogue
- Coordinates: 34°57′25″S 54°56′22″W

The Beit Yaacov Synagogue (Spanish: Sinagoga Beit Yaacov) is a Jewish congregation and synagogue, located on Calle Riso, near the bus station in Punta del Este, Maldonado Department, of southeastern Uruguay. The synagogue, with a central location, is mostly attended by Sephardi Jews.

== See also ==
- History of the Jews in Uruguay
- List of synagogues in Uruguay
