= Lussich Cove =

Cove in Antarctica

Lussich Cove (62°6′S 58°21′W) is a cove at the southeast side of Martel Inlet in Admiralty Bay, King George Island, in the South Shetland Islands. It was charted in 1909 by the Fourth French Antarctic Expedition under Jean-Baptiste Charcot, and named by him for Antonio Lussich of Montevideo, who was of assistance to the expedition.
