= Antonio Lussich =

Uruguayan sailor, arboricultorist & writer (1848-1928)

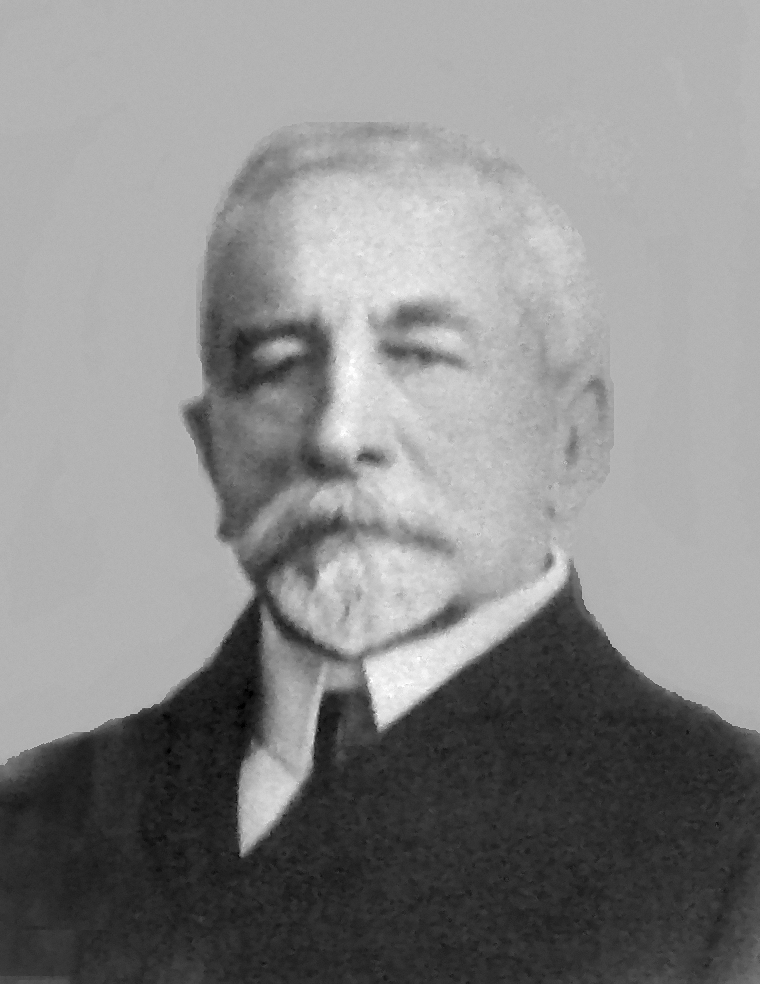
Antonio Lussich

Antonio Dionisio Lussich (23 March 1848 – 5 June 1928) was an Uruguayan sailor, arboricultorist, and writer who reforested the land he bought in Punta Ballena and founded the Lussich Arboretum. He managed a shipping company that was engaged in marine salvage.

== Early life and education ==
Antonio Lussich was born in Montevideo, Uruguay, on 23 June 1848, to Felipe Luksic and Carmen Griffo. His father was a Croatian from Brač, and his mother was an Italian. His father changed his last name from Luksic to Lussich. He studied at the Colegio Alemán until he was 14.

Giuseppe Garibaldi, a supporter of the Colorado Party, seized a ship from the Lussich family during the Uruguayan Civil War. This caused the Lussich family to become supporters of the National Party. Antonio joined Timoteo Aparicio's forces during the Revolution of the Lances.

== Career ==
After serving in the military, Lussich wrote Los tres gauchos orientales (The Three Eastern Gauchos). His father was dismissive of his work and told him that he could not live off of poetry.

Lussich's father owned a ship company, and after his death in 1889, Antonio held 40% of the company's stock while his brother held 60% of the stock. The company had 15 schooners, ketches, and yachts by 1882, and the brothers expanded this fleet to have 15 steamships. Marine salvage was conducted by the company in the Río de la Plata.

On 5 October 1896, Lussich bought 1,500 hectares in Punta Ballena. He worked on reforesting the area in spite of landscape architect Carlos Thays and botanist José Arechavaleta stating that nothing he planted would survive. Thays later praised Lussich's work. The Lussich Arboretum was constructed on this land and contained over 900 species of trees.

Lussich Cove was named in honour of Lussich by Jean-Baptiste Charcot in 1909, as Lussich provided assistance to the French Antarctic Expedition.

== Personal life ==
Lussich was able to speak five languages. He married Angela Portillo, with whom he had ten children. He named his only son Milton in honour of John Milton, the author of Paradise Lost.

Lussich died on 5 June 1928, and was buried in Punta Ballena.

== Works cited ==
=== News ===
- Fischer, Diego (14 January 2018). "El hombre que logró domar el viento". El País.

=== Web ===
- "Antonio Lussich". Hotel Terraza del Mar. Archived from the original on 21 May 2026.
- "Destacan obra de Antonio Lussich en la celebración del 174° aniversario de su natalicio". Maldonado Department. 24 March 2022. Archived from the original on 21 May 2026.
- "Lussich Cove". Australian Antarctic Data Centre. Archived from the original on 21 May 2026.
- "Recuerdan el 117 natalicio de Antonio Lussich". Maldonado Department. 21 March 2025. Archived from the original on 21 May 2026.
