= Hungarian Uruguayans =

Hungarian Uruguayans uruguayi magyarok
- (Hungary) (Uruguay)
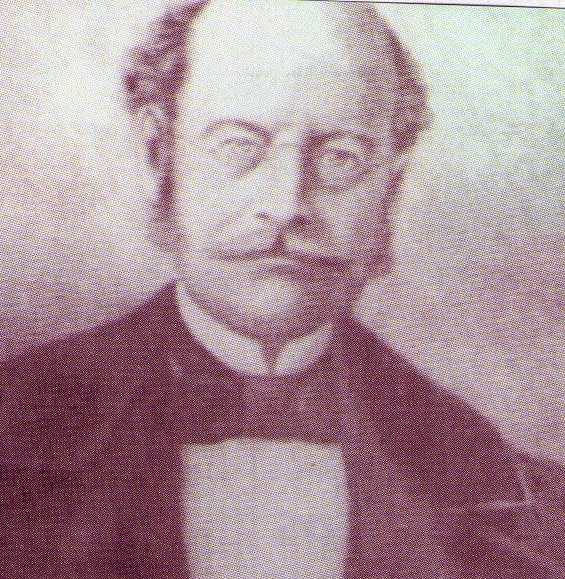
- Hungarian composer Debály Ferenc József (Francisco José Debali), author of the music of the National Anthem of Uruguay

Total population
- 3,000

Languages
- Uruguayan Spanish, Hungarian

Religion
- Christianity (mostly Roman Catholic and Protestant), Judaism

Related ethnic groups
- Hungarian Argentines, Hungarian Paraguayans, Hungarian diaspora

Hungarian Uruguayans (Hungarian: Uruguayi magyarok) are people born in Hungary who live in Uruguay or Uruguayan-born people of Hungarian descent.

== Overview ==
Hungarian Uruguayans are a local ethnic minority; their presence is small but meaningful, numbering around 2,000-3,000 of which ca. 150 were born in Hungary.

In 1925 was established a Society of Hungarian-Language Workers in Uruguay They even had some influence within the Communist Party of Uruguay.

In 1936, Hungarian migrants established the Hungarian Home of Uruguay (Hungarian: Uruguayi Magyar Otthon), an ethnic association.

There is also a small Jewish-Hungarian community, they established their own association in the 1920s, which in turn sent their representative to the Uruguayan Central Israeli Committee. Ana Balog was a Uruguayan girl of Hungarian Jewish descent who became a victim of the Holocaust.

There is an immigrant branch of the Batthyány noble family.

== Notable Hungarians in Uruguay ==
Past

- Francisco José Debali (1791-1859), composer of the National Anthem of Uruguay
- Carlos Végh Garzón (1902–1984), politician, Minister of Finance
- Alejandro Végh Villegas (1928-2017), economist, Minister of Economics and Finance

Present

- Carlos Batthyány (born 1969), scientist, director of the local Institut Pasteur
- Karina Batthyány (born 1968), academic
- Déborah Gyurcsek (born 1978), female track and field athlete
- Adrian R. Krainer, biochemist and molecular geneticist
- Jorge Polgar (born 1967), economist
- Krisztián Vadócz (born 1985), professional footballer
- Carlos A. Vegh (born 1958), economist

== See also ==
- Hungary–Uruguay relations
- Hungarian diaspora
- Immigration to Uruguay
