= History of the Jews in Uruguay =

Uruguayan Jews Judíos de Uruguay יהדות אורוגוואי
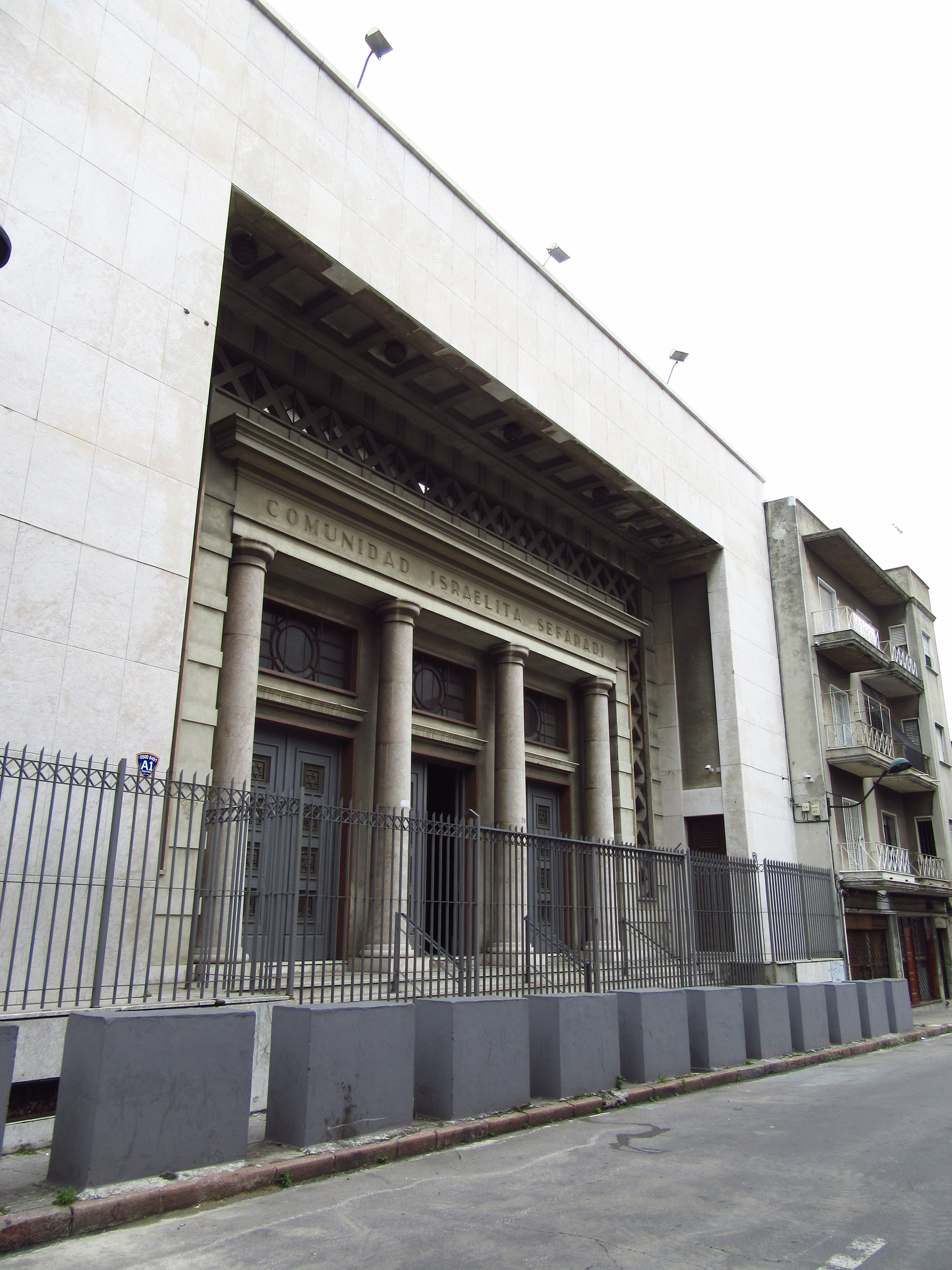
- Synagogue of the Sephardic Community

Total population
- 16,600–22,000

Regions with significant populations
- Predominantly in Montevideo; Punta del Este; Paysandú

Languages
- Uruguayan Spanish, Hebrew, Yiddish, Ladino

Religion
- Judaism

The history of the Jews in Uruguay goes back to colonial times. In the 1700s, Jews escaping from the Inquisition arrived in the Banda Oriental, territory of present-day Uruguay. However, the most important influx of Jews to Uruguay occurred during the end of the 19th century and to a greater extent during the first half of the 20th century, especially during World War I and II.

With an estimated 16,600–22,000 Jews, according to the American Jewish Year Book 2019, Uruguay is home to the fifth-largest Jewish community in Latin America, but the largest in terms of proportion relative to its total population. The country's community is mainly composed of Ashkenazim and includes Holocaust survivors and descendants.

== History ==
=== Colonial era and 19th century ===
The arrival of Jews to the Banda Oriental goes back to the 16th century, when conversos began settling there. The Spanish Inquisition was not a significant force in the territory, and the first recorded Jewish settlement there was in the 1770s. When the Inquisition ended in 1813, it paved the way for Jews being more accepted in Uruguay throughout the 19th century.

=== 20th century ===
Significant Jewish immigration to Uruguay began in the late 19th century, with the arrival of Jews from Brazil and Argentina. At the beginning of the 20th century, Uruguay became an attractive destination for Jews due to the secularism and prosperity following the reforms carried out during the Batlle era. The largest Jewish population was in Montevideo, whose Villa Muñoz neighbourhood received a large amount of the European Jewish immigration that came to Uruguay, which led it to become the Jewish quarter of the capital. Jewish schools and the first synagogue were established there in 1917 by a small Ashkenazi community.

The first recorded minyan happened in 1912. Despite the majority of Ashkenazi immigration, a significant number of Sephardim from the Ottoman Empire settled in the country. Most of them were poor and working-class, so upon their arrival they lived in tenements located in neighborhoods such as Ciudad Vieja, Palermo and Barrio Sur. In 1915, 30 Jewish families from Belarus and Bessarabia settled in the rural area of the Paysandú Department and established an agricultural settlement, Colonia 19 de Abril. Around that time, a Jewish cemetery was also established in the city of La Paz, 20 kilometers from Montevideo.

As the Jewish community in Uruguay grew during the early 20th century, a number of institutions were established to provide assistance to immigrants and promote community organization. After World War I, Jewish immigration increased significantly, particularly among Ashkenazi Jews from Eastern and Central Europe, including Latvia, Lithuania, Poland, Romania, and Czechoslovakia, as a result of growing antisemitism and political instability in the region. The Jewish population continued to expand during the interwar period, with the arrival of additional groups, including Italian, North African and Hungarian Jews.

Uruguayan Jews initially made a living through small-scale retail and peddling, with some working as craftsmen and artisans. Over time, many moved into larger commercial activities, becoming owners of large stores and medium-sized businesses. As a result, the community became predominantly middle class, particularly as a growing proportion of its members were second- and third-generation Uruguayans. Their economic advancement was aided by the creation of Jewish loan and assistance funds, some of which later developed into financial institutions such as the Banco Israelita del Uruguay.

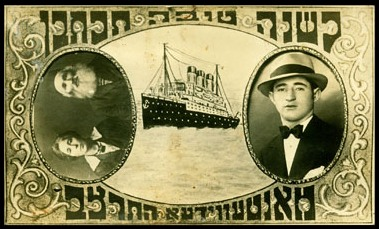
1932 Uruguayan Rosh Hashana greeting card in Yiddish.

The Uruguayan government's open immigration policy waned during Gabriel Terra's rule in the 1930s. During the Terra dictatorship (1933–38), a series of laws introduced immigration restrictions and expanded the grounds on which entry into the country could be denied. Despite these measures, and the refusal of some refugee ships arriving in Montevideo for failing to meet legal requirements, Jewish immigration to Uruguay continued throughout the decade, with an estimated 19,600 Jews arriving between 1927 and 1942. In 1936 the Uruguayan branch of B'nai B'rith was established.

With the rise of Nazism in Europe and the outbreak of World War II, the arrival of Jewish immigrants from Central and Eastern Europe to Uruguay increased. A considerable number of these immigrants were Jews from German-speaking Europe from middle-class backgrounds who were largely assimilated into European society and included bank employees, skilled workers, cattle breeders, researchers, lawyers, and physicians. Throughout the war, several aid organizations were also created, including the Comité Israelita de Ayuda a los Aliados, which supported the Allied cause.

Following their arrival in Uruguay, Jewish immigrants initially established separate organizations based on their origins and religious traditions. In 1940, however, the Israelite Community, the Sephardic Israelite Community, the Nueva Congregación Israelita, and the Hungarian Israelite Community merged to form the Central Israelite Committee of Uruguay (CCIU), which became the main representative organization of the Jewish community in the country. Further, in 1945 was established the Casa de Cultura Mordejai Anilevich.

At the end of World War II in 1945, Uruguayan immigration law required individuals seeking entry to demonstrate that they had sufficient financial resources to support themselves. In January 1945, however, the government established an exemption from this requirement for individuals with relatives already residing in Uruguay. As a result, between January and September 1946, approximately 1,578 Jewish survivors of the Holocaust settled in Uruguay, most of whom came from Poland, Germany, and Hungary.

During the establishment of Israel in 1948 and the subsequent 1948 Arab-Israeli War, which involved the mass exodus of Jews from Arab and Muslim countries, primarily to Israel, more than 18,000 Jews immigrated to Uruguay, including a number of Russian Jews and Hungarian Jews.

Uruguay, which had supported the creation of a Jewish homeland during the 1920 San Remo conference, was one of the first nations to recognize Israel, and the first Latin American country to do so. It was the first Latin American country and fourth country overall in which Israel established a diplomatic mission. It was also one of the few nations to support Jerusalem as the capital of Israel and oppose internationalization of the city. Its diplomatic mission in Jerusalem was upgraded to the status of an embassy in 1958, but subsequently moved to Tel Aviv after the enactment of the Jerusalem Law.

In 1952 the American Jewish Year Book estimated that Uruguay had about 40,000 Jews. However, in 1960 it was estimated at 50,000, the time in history when there were more Jews in the country.

The community experienced a serious decline in the 1970s and 1980s as a result of emigration. By the mid-1990s, there was little Jewish representation in the higher echelons of the military and in Parliament. In 1994, a Holocaust memorial was opened on the Rambla in the Punta Carretas neighborhood.

=== 21st century ===
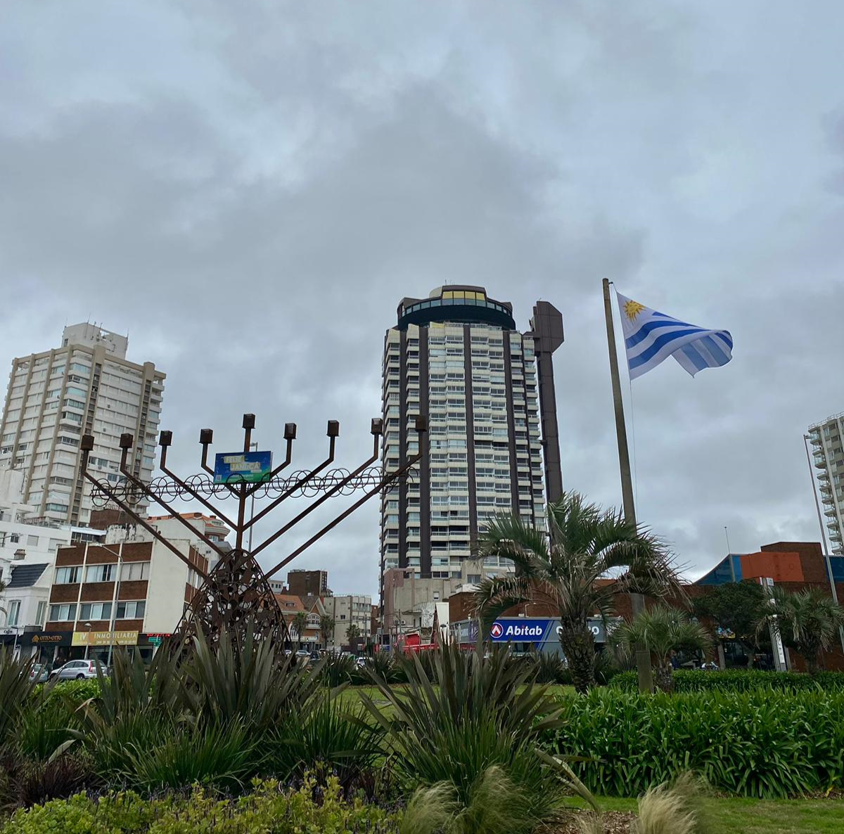
Public menorah in Punta del Este.

Between 1999 and 2002, as a result of the banking and economic crisis in Uruguay, approximately 2,000 Jews emigrated to Israel. By 2018, it was estimated that around 15,000 Uruguayan Jews and their descendants were living there.

As of 2009, 20,000-25,000 Jews lived in Uruguay, with 95% residing in Montevideo or its metropolitan area. Throughout the country, there are prominent organized communities in Punta del Este and Paysandú. As of 2003, there were 20 synagogues. Since 1985, when a menorah was first installed in a public space in Montevideo—its lighting ceremony attended by political authorities—this event has been held annually in both Montevideo and Punta del Este.

In 2017, a Holocaust memorial in Montevideo was vandalized with antisemitic graffiti, with phrases such as "The Holocaust of the Jewish people is the biggest lie in history" and “Gas chambers were a fraud.” This act of vandalism followed a renovation of the memorial which attempted to clean up the monument from previous acts of antisemitic vandalization.

President Yamandú Orsi lights a menorah during a commemoration of Kristallnacht at the synagogue of the Nueva Congregación Israelita in 2026.

In May 2018, the Intendancy of Montevideo authorized the installation of an eruv along the city's Rambla, covering the neighborhoods of Pocitos, Buceo and Punta Carretas. The eruv stretches from Bulevar General Artigas to Avenida Doctor Luis Alberto de Herrera. In September 2022, construction of a second eruv was completed in Punta del Este, extending to the city of Maldonado.

== Notable Uruguayan Jews ==
Past

- Izak Algazi (died 1950), Musician for both Jew and Ottoman tradition.
- Monsieur Chouchani (died 1968), mysterious scholar
- Zoma Baitler (1908-1994), artist and diplomat
- Itsik Vaynshenker (1914–1978), writer and journalist
- Chil Rajchman (1914-2004), Holocaust survivor and entrepreneur
- José Gurvich (1927-1974), painter
- Carlos Sherman (1934-2005), writer
- Hugo Fernández Faingold (1947-2025), academic and politician, Vicepresident of the Republic (1998-2000)

Present

- Mauricio Rosencof (born 1933), former guerrilla fighter, playwright, poet and journalist
- George Davidsohn (born 1936), businessman, founder of Davidsohn Global Technologies
- Luis Camnitzer (born 1937), artist, art critic and writer
- Benjamín Nahum (born 1937), historian and academic
- Alberto Couriel (born 1935), public accountant and politician
- Teresa Porzecanski (born 1945), anthropologist and writer
- Ricardo Ehrlich (born 1948), engineer, Intendant of Montevideo (2005-2010)
- Henry Cohen Engelman (born 1954), physician and academic
- Gisele Ben-Dor (born 1955), conductor
- Roberto Kreimerman (born 1958), engineer and politician
- Mario Lubetkin (born 1959), journalist, Foreign Minister (2025-)
- Sergio Gorzy (born 1958), sports journalist
- Isaac Alfie (born 1962), economist, Minister of Economy and Finance (2003-2005)
- Jorge Drexler (born 1964), singer/songwriter, Academy Award for Best Original Song 2004
- Alejandro Stock (born 1965), artist
- Suzie Navot, constitutional law scholar
- Freddy Nieuchowicz, aka Orlando Petinatti (born 1968), radio host
- Daniel Hendler (born 1976), actor
- Álvaro Brechner (born 1976), film director, writer and producer
- Marcelo Lipatín (born 1977), football player
- Gabe Saporta (born 1979), singer/songwriter/bassist
- Andy Ram (born 1980), retired professional tennis player
- Marcel Felder (born 1984), tennis player, gold medal at the 2013 Maccabiah Games
- Ariel Behar (born 1989), tennis player
- Camila Rajchman (born 1994), singer and television personality.

== See also ==
- List of synagogues in Uruguay
- Israel-Uruguay relations
- Holocaust Memorial, Montevideo
- Uruguayan Jews in Israel
