= Benko =

Benko, Benkó (pron. [benko]) or Benkö, Benkő (pron. [benkoe]) may refer to:

== Arts and entertainment ==
- Filip Benko (born 1986), Swedish actor
- Gregor Benko (born 1944), American writer, lecturer, record producer, and collector-historian
- Gyula Benkő (1918–1997), Hungarian actor
- Péter Benkő (born 1947), Hungarian actor
- Tina Benko, American actress

== Games and sport ==
=== Chess ===
- Francisco Benkö (1910–2010), German-Argentine chess player and problemist
- Pal Benko (1928–2019), Hungarian-American chess player, author, and composer of endgame studies and chess problems

=== Football ===
- Aleksandar Benko (1925–1991), Croatian football player
- Fabian Benko (born 1998), German-Croatian football player
- Günter Benkö (born 1955), Austria football referee
- Jože Benko (born 1980), Slovenian football player
- Leon Benko (born 1983), Croatian football player

=== Sprint canoeing ===
- Katalin Benkő (1941–2023), Hungarian sprint canoeist
- Tamás Benkő, Hungarian sprint canoeist
- Zoltán Benkő (born 1983), Hungarian sprint canoeist

=== Other ===
- Gregory Benko (born 1952), Australian foil fencer
- Lindsay Benko (born 1976), American swimmer
- Tibor Benkő (1905–1988), Hungarian fencer and modern pentathlete

== Other ==
- Andrés Benkö (born 1943), founder of the Universidad Americana of Paraguay
- René Benko (born 1977), Austrian businessman

== See also ==
- Benko Gambit, chess opening
- Benko Opening, chess opening
- Benkos Biohó, (late 16th century–1621), Mandinka and South American leader, founder of San Basilio de Palenque
- Benkow
