= Israel–Uruguay relations =

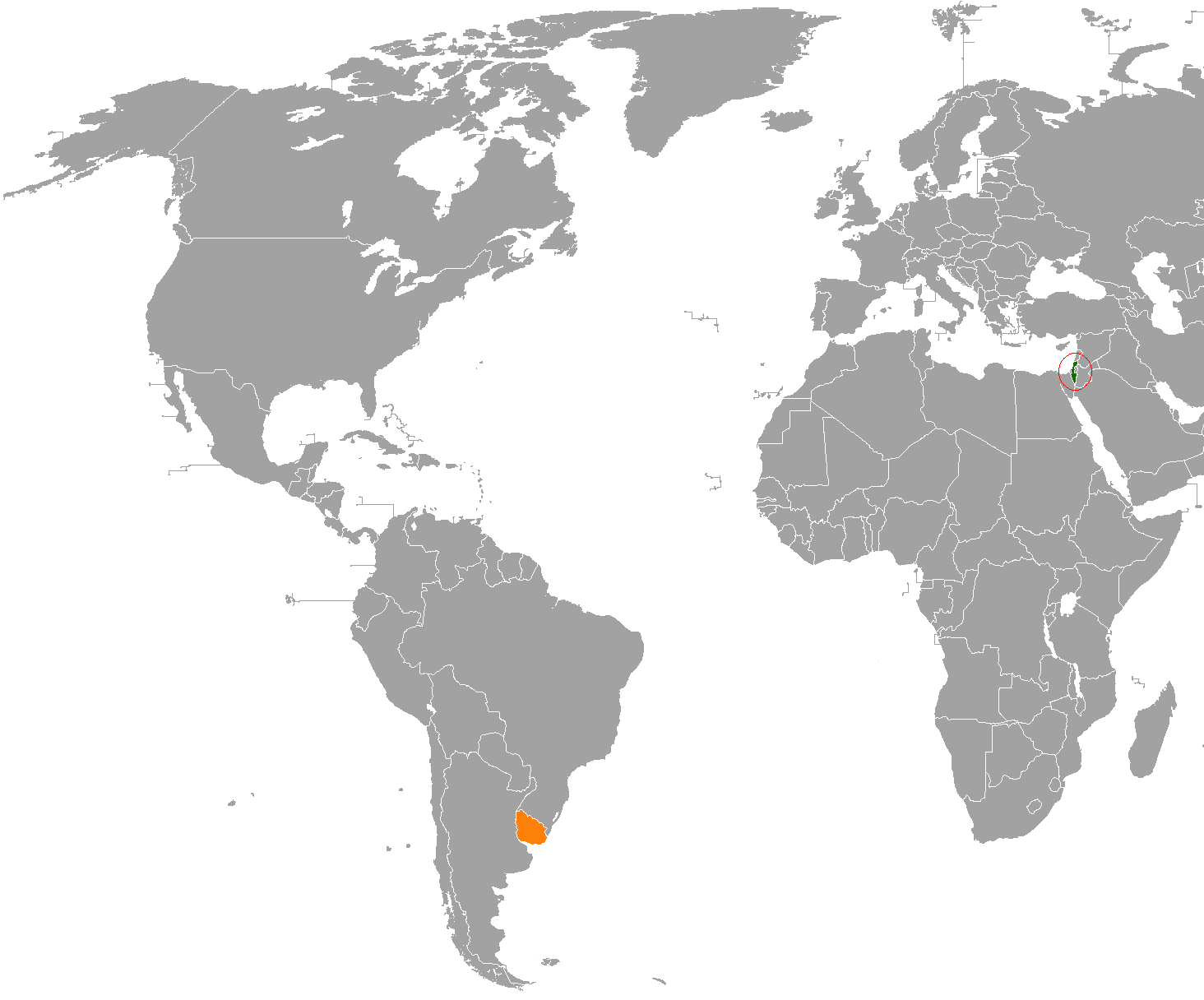
- Israel: Uruguay

Diplomatic mission
- Embassy of Israel, Montevideo: Embassy of Uruguay, Tel Aviv

Envoy
- Ambassador Michal Hershkovitz: Ambassador Manuel Etchevarren

Israel–Uruguay relations are the bilateral ties between the State of Israel and the Oriental Republic of Uruguay. Uruguay was the first country in South America and the fourth worldwide to recognize the State of Israel.

== History ==
In 1944, the Comité Uruguayo Pro-Palestina Hebrea (Spanish for 'Uruguayan Committee for a Hebrew Palestine') was established as an organization founded by liberal intellectuals and public figures supporting the creation of a Jewish state in the region of Palestine. In May 1947, Uruguay was among the eleven member countries of the United Nations Special Committee on Palestine, created by the UN General Assembly. The Uruguayan delegation was composed of Enrique Rodríguez Fabregat as representative, Óscar Secco Ellauri as alternate, and Edmundo Sisto as secretary.

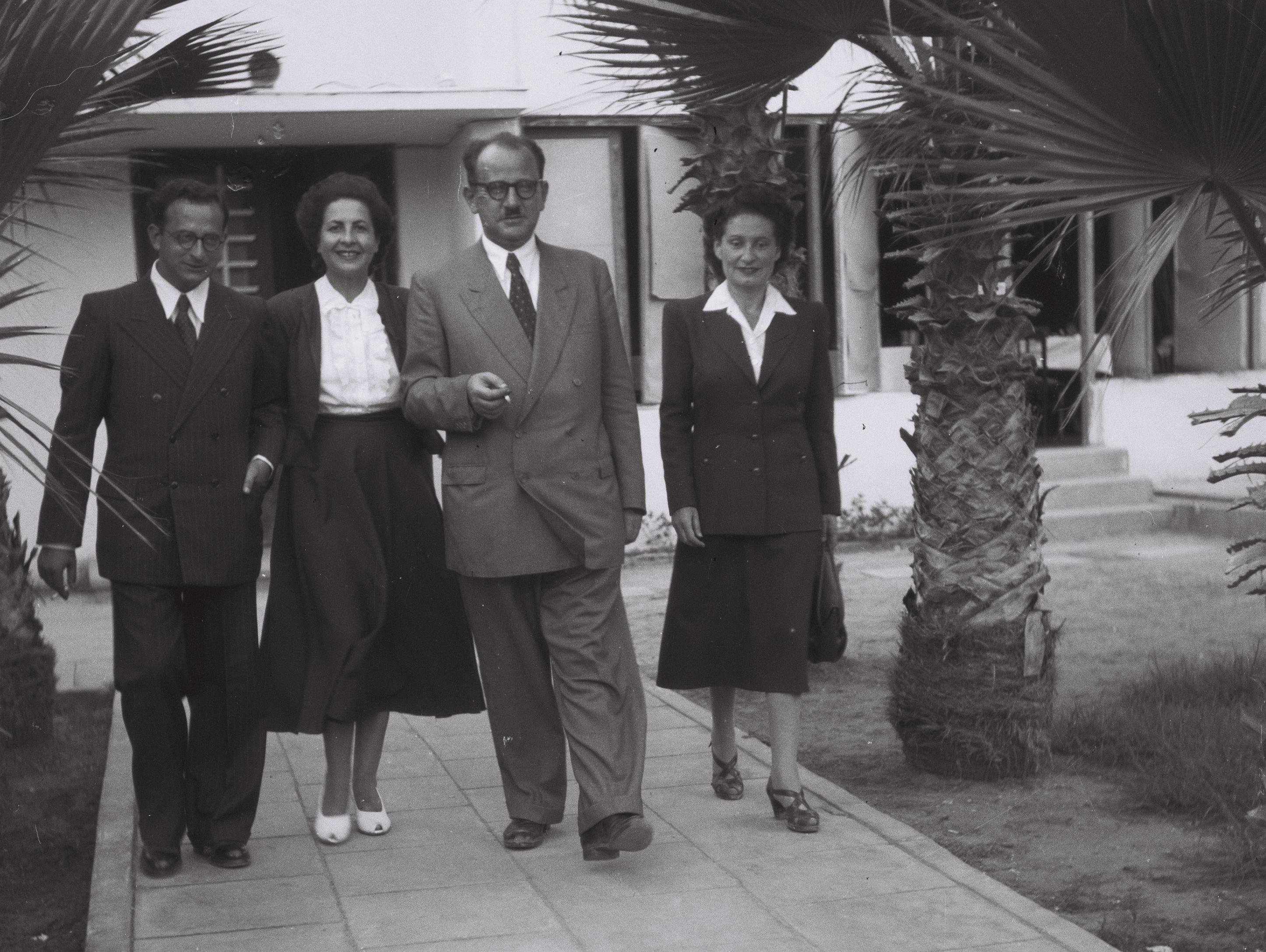
Yitzhak Navon heading an Israeli delegation to Uruguay, October 1948

On 29 November 1947, Uruguay voted in favor for the Partition Plan for Palestine which led to the creation of the State of Israel. On May 19, 1948, Uruguay recognized Israel, and the two countries established diplomatic relations. The Israeli embassy in Montevideo was the fourth Israeli embassy to be established worldwide and Jacob Tsur was the first head of mission. In October 1948, future Israeli President Yitzhak Navon headed a diplomatic delegation to Uruguay.

Since its establishment in 1954, Uruguay’s embassy to Israel was located in Tel Aviv. In 1957, however, the National Council of Government decided to relocate it to Jerusalem, on the grounds that Israel’s administrative institutions were based there, and that Uruguay’s diplomatic mission should be located accordingly. Following the enactment of the Jerusalem Law in 1980, the authorities of the civic–military dictatorship decided to move the embassy back to Tel Aviv.

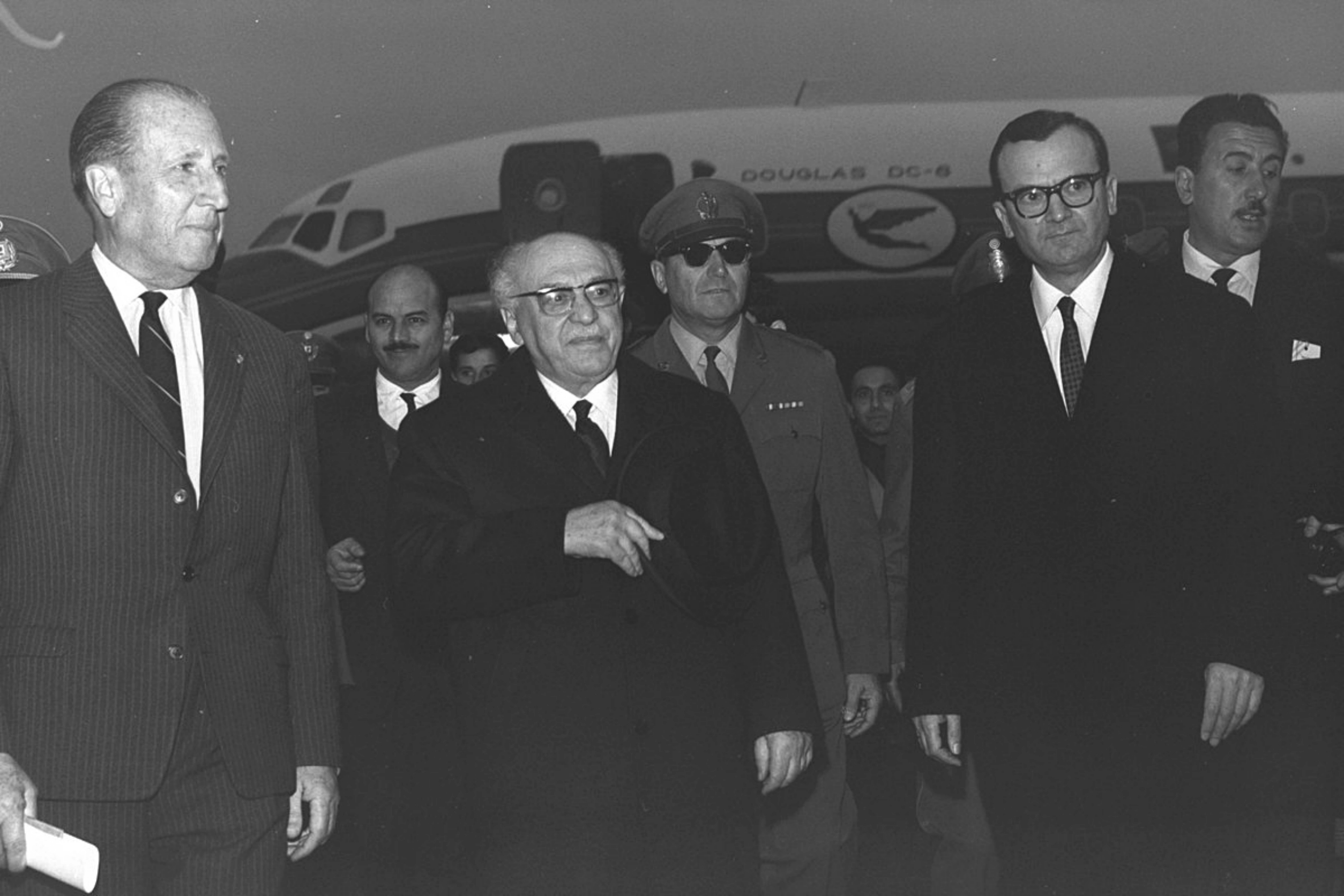
Israeli President Zalman Shazar arriving at Carrasco International Airport, 1966.

In 1966, Zalman Shazar became the first Israeli president to visit Uruguay. During the visit, both countries signed an agreement on cooperation in the peaceful use of atomic energy. In 1986, Julio María Sanguinetti became the first Uruguayan president to pay an official visit to Israel, and he visited the country again in 1998, during which agreements were signed in the fields of social security, investment, and medical and veterinary cooperation. In August 2008, Uruguayan President Tabaré Vázquez paid an official visit to Israel. During the visit, the two countries signed an agreement to promote industrial research and development. Vázquez also visited Yad Vashem, where he presented documentation and information on Ana Balog, a Uruguayan child murdered at Auschwitz during the Holocaust.

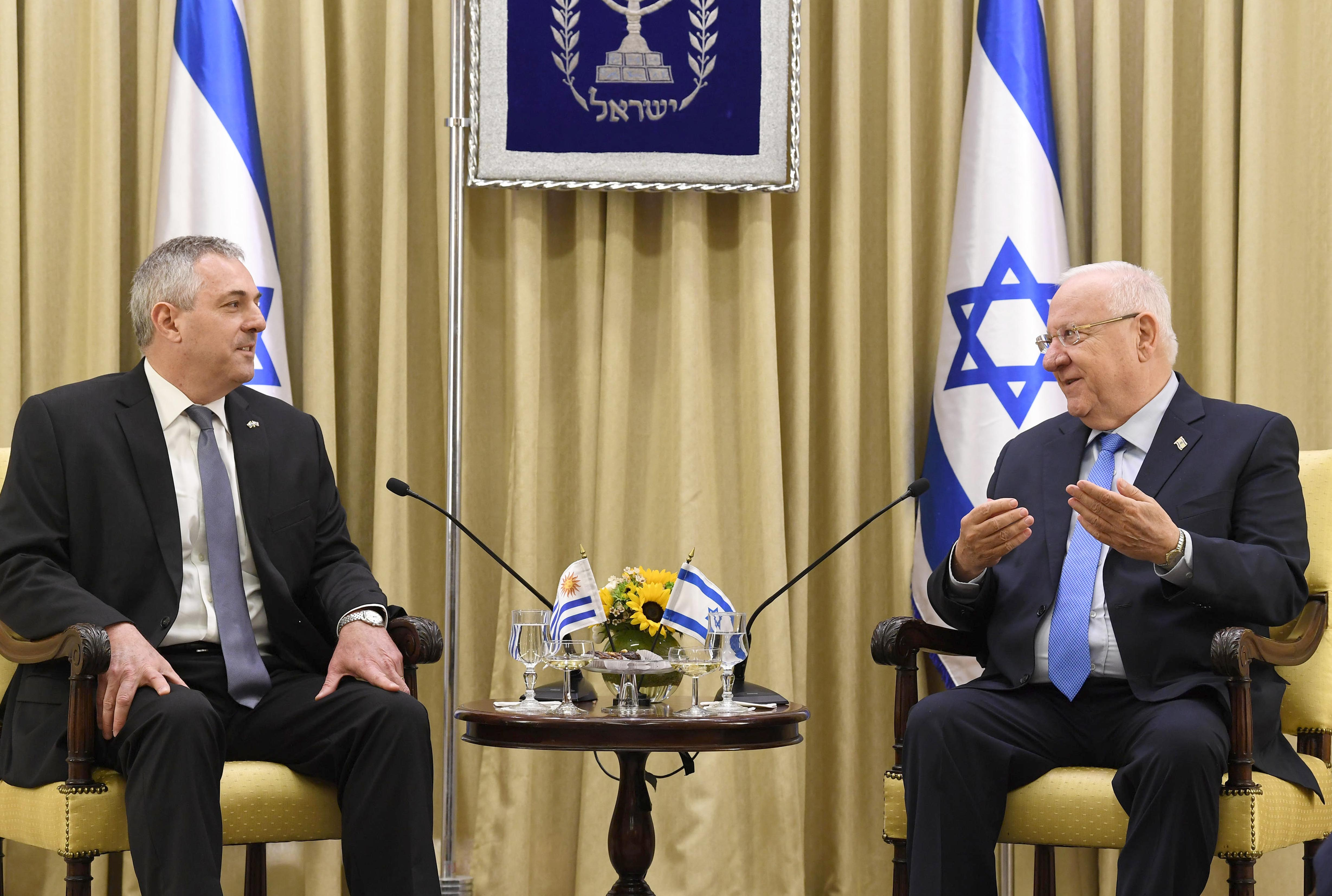
Israeli President Reuven Rivlin with Uruguayan ambassador to Israel, November 2017

In 2010, Israel signed a Free Trade Agreement with Mercosur (which includes Uruguay). In 2016, the Israeli embassy in Montevideo transferred supplies to aid flood victims in Uruguay, where more than 13,000 people were displaced.

On 29 September 2020, Uruguay fired one of its top diplomats after UN Watch exposed the country’s vote for a UN resolution that singled out Israel alone in the world for supposedly violating women’s rights. Uruguay’s Foreign Minister Francisco Bustillo declared that his country’s UN vote against Israel was a “circumstantial error,” and removed the foreign ministry’s director-general of political affairs, Pablo Sader, stating that Uruguay’s “foreign policy will keep its historical stance to defend the rights of Israel.”

In August 2023, it was announced that Uruguay would open a diplomatic office in Jerusalem aimed at boosting cooperation "in the field of innovation". The announcement prompted the UN Special Rapporteur on the Occupied Palestinian Territories, Francesca Albanese, as well as the Embassy of Palestine in Uruguay, to request that the Uruguayan government reconsider its decision. The office was inaugurated in December 2024 and is overseen by the National Agency for Research and Innovation of Uruguay, which signed an agreement with the Hebrew University of Jerusalem.

In May 2025, Uruguay summoned the Israeli ambassador to Uruguay after the Israeli Defense Forces fired warning shots towards diplomats during a diplomatic visit in Jenin.

== Resident diplomatic missions ==
- Israel has an embassy in Montevideo.
- Uruguay has an embassy in Tel Aviv.

== See also ==
- Foreign relations of Israel
- Foreign relations of Uruguay
- History of the Jews in Uruguay
- Uruguayan Jews in Israel
