= Hungarian Paraguayans =

Hungarian Paraguayans magyarok paraguayban
- (Hungary) (Paraguay)
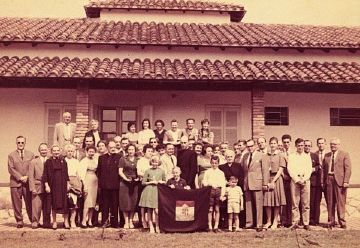
- Members of the Asociación Húngara del Paraguay in 1975.

Languages
- Paraguayan Spanish, Hungarian

Religion
- Christianity (mostly Roman Catholic and Protestant)

Related ethnic groups
- Hungarian Argentines, Hungarian Uruguayans, Hungarian diaspora

Hungarian Paraguayans (Hungarian: paraguayi magyarok) are people born in Hungary who live in Paraguay or Paraguayan-born people of Hungarian descent.

== History ==
Long before Paraguay became an independent country, some Hungarians had already arrived, most notably Roman Catholic priests working in the Jesuit Reductions, such as László Orosz. A relevant Hungarian immigrant was the military engineer Francisco Wister de Morgenstern, who authored many important works, such as the Presidential Palace.

During the Second World War and afterwards came the biggest immigration wave of Hungarians, who established their own institution in 1936, Asociación Húngara del Paraguay. They also developed several activities: for instance, Stampf-Mohácsi couple established the first factory of mannequins in Paraguay; or the Palkovics-Sebo in gastronomy.

The most notable Hungarian Paraguayan was President Juan Carlos Wasmosy (being Vámosy the original family name, afterwards Hispanicized). Another important Hungarian immigrant is Andrés Benkö, an academic who helped establish the Universidad Americana.

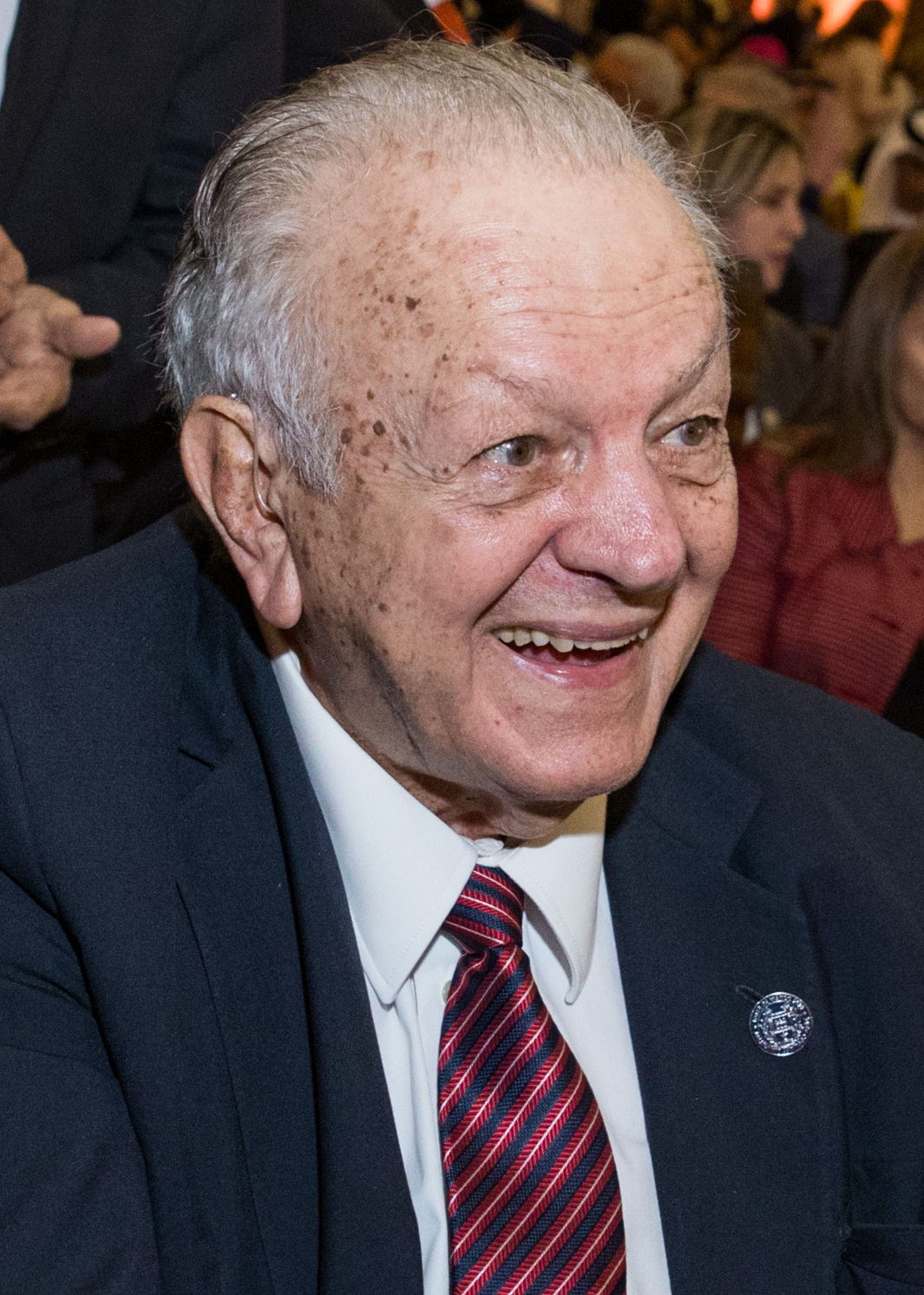
Juan Carlos Wasmosy, President of Paraguay 1993-1998.

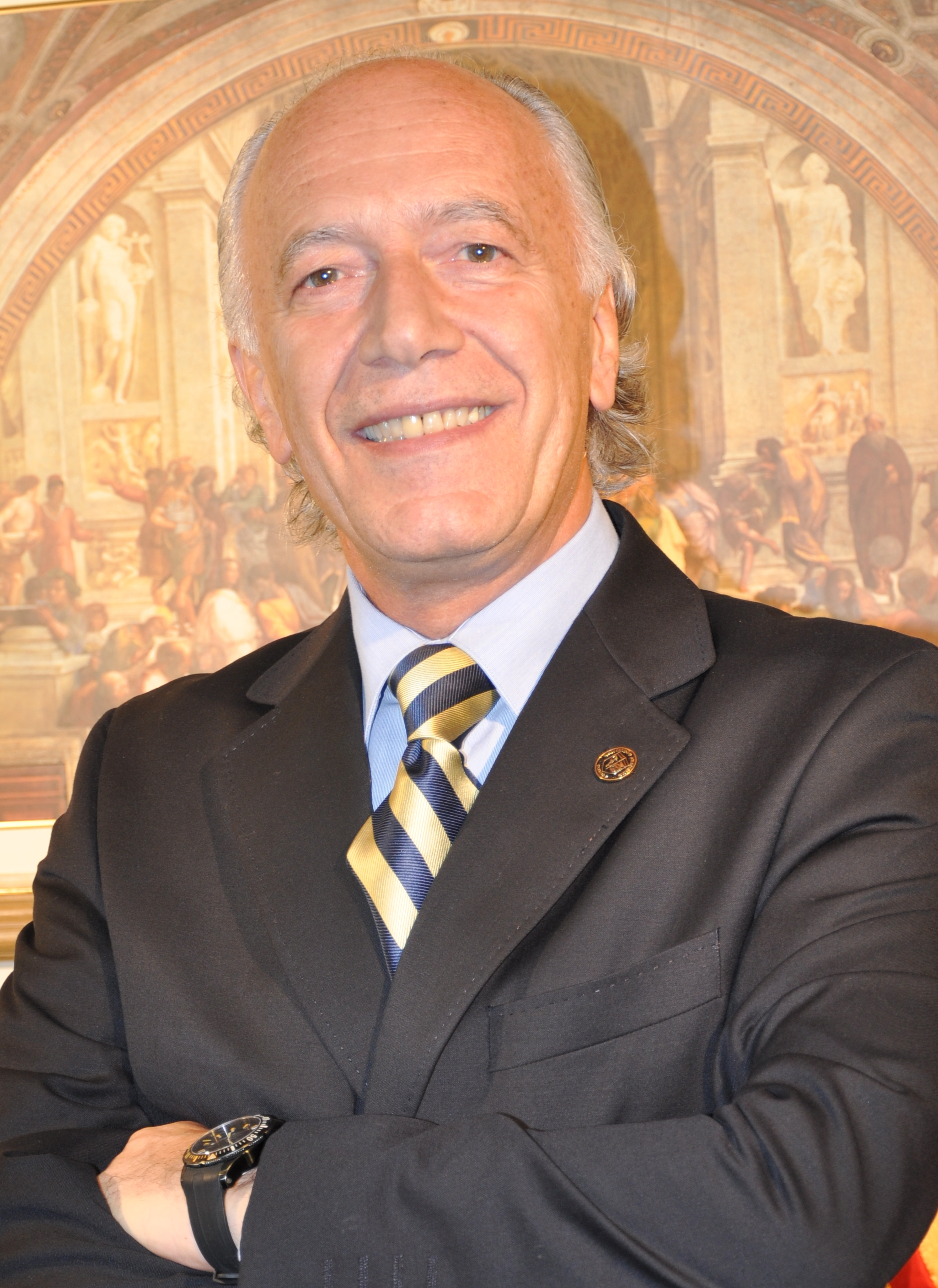
Andrés Benkö Kapuváry, PhD, Rector of the Universidad Americana.

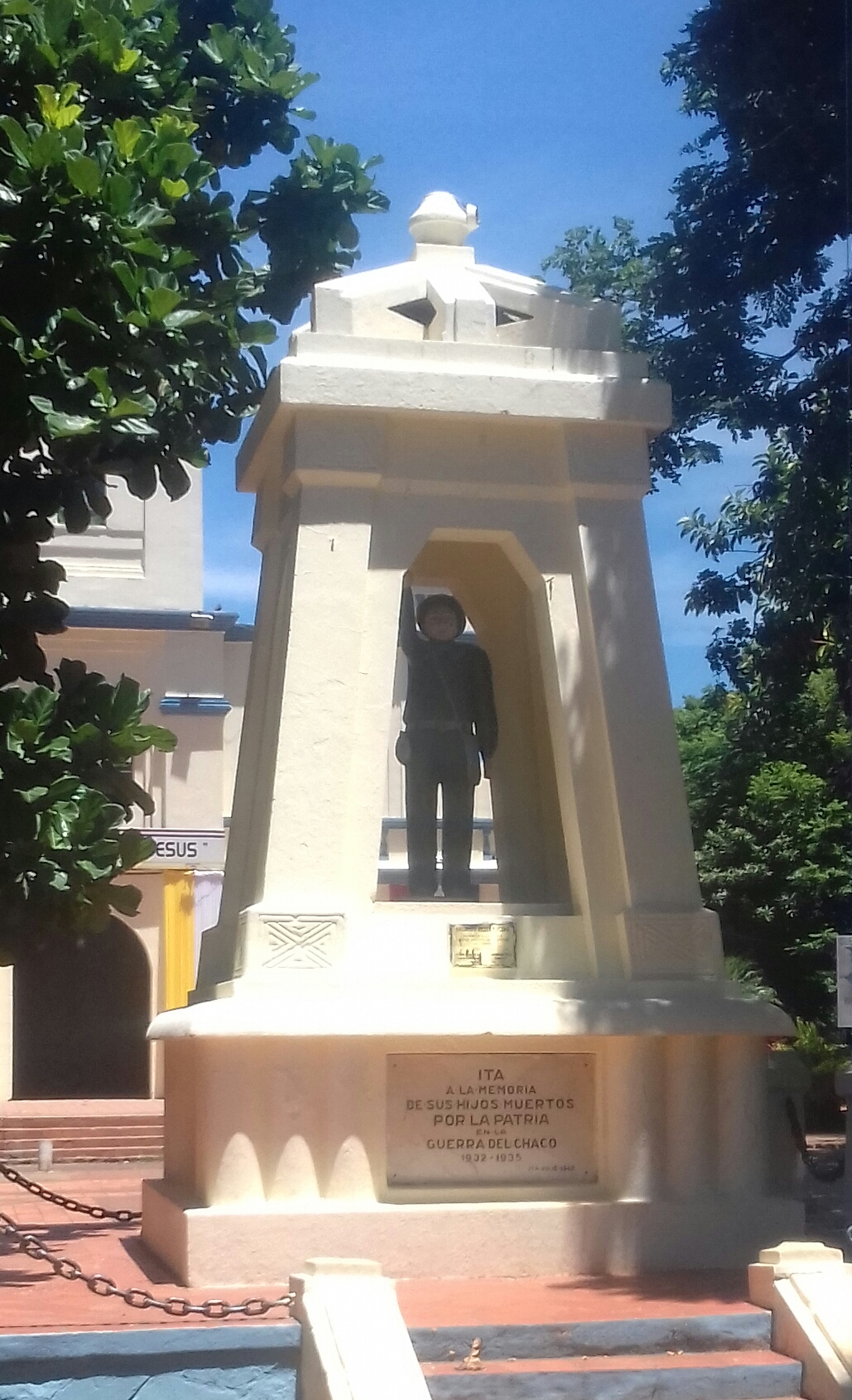
monument to the fallen heroes of the Chaco War, by Adan Kunos (1890–1979).

== See also ==
- Hungarian diaspora
- Immigration to Paraguay
