= Lieberman Plan =

Israeli–Palestinian peace plan

The Lieberman Plan, also known in Israel as the "Populated-Area Exchange Plan", was proposed in May 2004 by Avigdor Lieberman, the leader of the Israeli political party Yisrael Beiteinu. The plan suggested an exchange of "populated territories" – territories populated by both Arabs and Jews – between Israel and the Palestinian Authority.

Lieberman maintained that everywhere in the world where there are two peoples with two religions, a conflict exists, and noted that in the Israeli–Palestinian conflict, the situation was worse, as there was not only a religious conflict, but also a nationalistic one. Therefore, the proposition was based on 'reduction of conflict' and maintained that the two peoples could live together, but it would make no sense to have one living inside the other. On top of this, Lieberman maintained that it made no sense to create a Palestinian state that has no Jewish people while Israel was turned into a dual-population state with more than 20% of minorities.

In general, Arab Israelis were opposed to the plan and many believed it constituted racism. The Israeli left also opposed the plan. Legal experts cast doubt on the legality of such a move under Israeli and international law.

== The plan ==
The Lieberman Plan suggested a territorial exchange whereby Israel would annex almost all Israeli settlements in the West Bank which were situated in major settlement blocs close to the border, and withdraw from the remaining few deep inside the Palestinian territories. At the same time, it would transfer Arab-Israeli areas to the Palestinian state. While there were three major Arab regions in Israel, all contiguous with the West Bank (southern and central Galilee, the central region known as "the Triangle", and the Bedouin region in the northern part of the Negev desert), the Lieberman Plan only advocated ceding the Triangle. All Arab residents of the Triangle would lose their Israeli citizenship. The Druze community, whose leaders are mainly pro-Israel, would remain part of Israel. All remaining citizens, whether Jews or Arabs would have to pledge an oath of allegiance to the state in order to keep their Israeli citizenship.

The plan would reduce both the Arab population of Israel and the Jewish population of the West Bank, creating more ethnically homogeneous states without anyone moving. Various estimates as to the number of Arab-Israelis affected by the plan varied from a high of 90% of current Arab Israelis in Lieberman's own estimate to as little as 11.8% of Arab citizens being affected (2.3% of Israel's population overall) according to a study by the Floersheimer Institute for Policy Studies.

=== Lieberman's argument for the plan ===
Lieberman's main argument for the plan was that it is not a population transfer, since the plan did not call for any forcible removal of anyone from their home. The plan, instead, would simply redraw the border between Palestinian and Israeli communities to make them more homogeneous (i.e., nearby Arab communities are redrawn to be included in the Palestinian Territory, while nearby Jewish territories are redrawn to be included in Israel).

In an open Q&A with Haaretz, Lieberman noted that it is of great importance to have a partner on the Arab side and stated that he communicated his plan to the Palestinians and the Arab states prior to making it public in Israel. Lieberman stated his belief that the Arab world understood that his plan would be of benefit to the region and cited that there were no denunciations from either the Palestinians or the Arab world to this plan.

== Poll of Umm Al-Fahm residents ==
Survey among residents of Umm Al-Fahm
Prefer joining Palestinian State	11%
Prefer continued Israeli jurisdiction	83%
No opinion	6%
Source: Kul Al-Arab, 2000

Respondents opposed joining future Palestinian State
Prefer to remain in democratic regime with high living standards	54%
Satisfied with present situation	18%
Not willing to make sacrifices for creation of Palestinian state	14%
No stated reason	11%
Source: Kul Al-Arab, 2000

A 2000 poll conducted by the Arab-language weekly Kul Al-Arab in Umm Al-Fahm found that an 83% majority opposed having their town transferred to Palestinian rule, with only 11% in favor.

== Views of the Islamic Movement ==
The deputy leader of the Islamic Movement's northern branch, Sheikh Kamel Khatib, said of the Lieberman plan that the only acceptable population exchange for him would be for the Soviet-born Lieberman to: "return to his country while refugees in Syria and Lebanon return to their homeland".

== Feasibility ==
According to Timothy Waters, "objections about feasibility ... are really not based on a belief that transfer is impossible, but a conviction that it is undesirable".

The Plan conformed with generalized support both inside and outside of Israel for a two-state solution. Supporters within Israel seek a state that is both democratic and Jewish; the Lieberman Plan would achieve this goal. For those that believe that the ideal solution to the Israel-Arab conflict would be greater separation between Jews and Arabs, this plan would certainly achieve such a goal. The Plan also minimizes the population of the minority in each state, which can be viewed (in the case of either minority) as "untrustworthy, unwanted, destabilizing, disruptive or simply different". Demographically, the plan creates two states which are more ethnically homogeneous, and likely would achieve the political goals of both the Palestinian and Israeli leadership. In summary, according to Waters: "It is entirely plausible that the Plan could contribute to peace, if peace could be achieved through a greater separation of Jews and Palestinians. That is, after all, the assumption underlying all two-state solutions."

However, most assumptions about feasibility, including Waters', assumed that the Plan would result from a multi-lateral agreement. There did not seem to be support for it from a willing Palestinian partner, thus decreasing the likelihood that it would be successful in achieving peace.

== Legality ==
Several issues of legality arose under the Lieberman Plan: the transfer of territory, revoking the citizenship of a people (i.e., the Arabs) – either through transfer of territory or a loyalty oath – and the gaining of new territory (settlement blocs in the West Bank). Timothy Waters wrote that the plan could be creatively imagined as a secession – as if Israel was seceding from its present borders to smaller borders where the Jews have a larger majority.

=== Transfer of territory ===
Generally speaking, land transfer, as opposed to population transfer, is legal under both International and Israeli law. The Israeli precedent was exemplified in 1979 when Israel agreed to transfer the Sinai Desert in exchange for peace with Egypt. The issue that arose with this plan was the transfer of populated territories and the revocation of citizenship for those in the transferred areas. Even this, in principle, seems to be legal under international law.

=== Revocation of citizenship through transfer of territory ===
A number of legal experts questioned by The Jerusalem Post in 2006 argued that stripping Israeli Arabs of citizenship as part of a population and territorial swap with the Palestinian Authority would "run counter to Israeli and international law". They stated that Israel could decide that the "Triangle", which is populated mostly by Israeli Arabs, is no longer part of Israel but that she could not revoke the citizenship of the people living there. However, others questioned in the same report, including parliamentary and constitutional law teacher, Suzie Navot, argued that the legality of the plan was unclear, and would likely need a ruling from the High Court of Justice to determine its legality. Yisrael Beiteinu's legal adviser Yoav Many believes the plan is legal and "would be accepted not just in Israel but also within the international community".

Timothy Waters wrote that the plan, contrary to many arguments, was not an example of ethnic cleansing nor apartheid since it would not move any Arab from their land. He wrote that states have the right to transfer (or withdraw from) territory, even against the wishes of the population, or to revoke the citizenship of inhabitants. The Lieberman Plan advocated for the affected Arab Israelis to become citizens of Palestine, not be rendered stateless, and hence doesn't violate the 1961 Convention on the Reduction of Statelessness. Waters also argued that while a state cannot strip an entire ethnic group of their citizenship, it may practice some forms of ethnic discrimination "because ethnicity plays an accepted role in constructing citizenship". He pointed to the expulsion of black Senegalese from Mauritania, the stripping of northern Muslims of their citizenship by Côte d'Ivoire and the denationalization of Germans from Czechoslovakia (whose legality, he says, was later upheld in courts). Waters also argued that, while the transfer of Israeli Arabs to a Palestinian state would harm their interests (e.g. reduction in standard of life), it doesn't violate any of their human rights.

While there were international precedents for the idea of populated land exchange, and international law seemed to be favorable, there was no such precedent under Israeli law. Scholars tended to agree that the plan was, at best, questionable under Israeli law. There was no Israeli law which would deal with this issue. In order for it to be implemented, the Knesset would have to enact legislation, and the High Court of Justice would rule on its legality. It was unlikely that either International or Israeli law would allow revocation of citizenship without a bilateral agreement with the Palestinian Authority.

=== Revocation of citizenship through a citizenship oath ===
Individuals who would prefer to remain in Israel instead of becoming citizens of a Palestinian state would be able to move to Israel. All citizens of Israel would be required to swear a loyalty oath to retain citizenship. Those who refused could remain in Israel as permanent residents. The loyalty oath would apply to all citizens regardless of ethnicity. According to Timothy Waters "the loyalty oath almost certainly violates international law." The rationale behind this was that international law sees citizenship as an automatic right. Furthermore, those who refused to take the oath would be stateless, unlike those transferred under the population exchange part of the plan.

=== Annexation of West Bank settlements ===
Timothy Waters wrote that while Israel does have the right to unilaterally withdraw its borders from Arab territory, it cannot unilaterally take territory in the West Bank (in particular the Israeli settlements there). While it would be legitimate for a sovereign Palestine to transfer territory to Israeli control, Palestine would be under no obligation to do so. Waters bases this on the argument that the West Bank, including East Jerusalem, constitute occupied territory.

== Criticism ==
=== Moral arguments ===
Most criticisms of the plan focused on the undesirability of separation as opposed to its infeasibility. Many Arab citizens of Israel criticized the plan as being racist and were, in general, opposed to it. While the plan would not require them to leave their homes, Arabs in Israel argued that they are native to the region and insist that as Israeli citizens, they deserved equal rights within the state, and should not be singled out by ethnic or religious background. Various polls showed that Arabs in Israel in general did not wish to move to the West Bank or Gaza if a Palestinian state was created there.

Several Israeli left-wing commentators argued against the plan as well. Jewish critics sympathetic to the idea of exchanging populated territories argued that it would be preferable to do this as part of a comprehensive peace agreement. They pointed out that while Arabs under the plan would still be allowed to retain Israeli citizenship if they take an oath of allegiance, no reciprocal possibility existed.

Akiva Eldar of Haaretz said that the plan undermines the moral high ground of Israel. Haaretz argued that the plan "is nothing but polite packaging that does not succeed in concealing its real aspiration: delegitimizing all the Arab citizens of Israel".

Daniel Gordis wrote that the plan's implementation would be highly demoralizing to those Arabs who would not be removed and might give them the sense that Israel does not want them. Gordis argued that this could set back any attempt to build better relations with the Israeli-Arab community. However, he acknowledged that they might already believe that Israel didn't want them and are unlikely to embrace Israel as a Jewish state, and that nothing Israel did would convince them otherwise.

=== Strategic arguments ===
Other pro-Arab commentators expressed skepticism that such a land-and-population transfer would result in the withdrawal of Israeli settlers and, hence, IDF soldiers from areas of Israeli residence in the Lieberman-envisioned Palestinian state. Another concern was that Israeli zones within the West Bank would be subject to security threats, putting the IDF at high risk to defend them.
