= Ana Balog =

Uruguayan Holocaust victim (1930–1945)

- Born: Ana Balog Frenkel; 27 February 1930; Montevideo, Uruguay
- Died: January 1945 (aged 14); Auschwitz-Birkenau, German-occupied Poland
- Cause of death: Hydrogen cyanide poisoning (Zyklon B)
- Parents: Kornelia Frenkel (mother); Segismundo Balog (father)

Ana Balog Frenkel (February 27, 1930 – January 1945) was a Uruguayan Jewish girl murdered in the gas chambers of the Auschwitz concentration camp, during the Holocaust.

== Biography ==
Ana Bálog was born on 27 February 1930 at the Hospital Pereira Rossell in Montevideo, Uruguay, to Segismundo Bálog, a Christian convert to Judaism, and Kornelia Frenkel, who came from an Orthodox Jewish family from Öcs. Both of her parents were Hungarian immigrants. She had an older sister, Eva, born in 1928, who survived the Holocaust and later died in Uruguay in 2019.

Her parents, who had married in Hungary, decided to emigrate to Uruguay in 1928 due to economic difficulties and social rejection resulting from their interfaith marriage. They arrived in Uruguay while Kornelia, then 19 years old, was pregnant with their first daughter. The family settled in a tenement house in Montevideo's Ciudad Vieja, where Segismundo worked as a jeweller.

In the late 1930s, due to the family's ongoing economic difficulties and with the aim of re-establishing their daughters’ ties with their extended family, Kornelia returned to Hungary with the children. Eva was sent to live with an aunt in Tokaj, while Ana stayed with her maternal grandmother in Öcs. Kornelia later worked as a cook at the Italian Embassy in Budapest and as a translator at the Argentine Embassy, aided by her knowledge of Spanish language acquired during her years in Uruguay.

Following the Nazi occupation of Hungary, the family was separated. Kornelia found refuge at the Argentine Embassy, while Eva, with the assistance of a non-Jewish Hungarian woman, was able to reunite with her mother. Ana, who remained with her maternal grandmother, was arrested and deported to the Auschwitz concentration camp, where both were murdered in the gas chambers.

Through the intervention of the Argentine diplomatic mission, Kornelia and Eva obtained diplomatic passports, enabling them to escape to Sweden and later return to Uruguay.

== Legacy ==
In 2007, Uruguayan President Tabaré Vázquez submitted to Yad Vashem official documentation and information held by the Uruguayan government regarding Ana Balog, including her birth certificate.

In 2009, a commemorative plaque in her honor was installed at the Holocaust Memorial in Montevideo.

== Bibliography ==
- Facal Santiago, Silvia; Racioppi Rüsch, Florencia (2018). Desde los confines del mundo magiar a Uruguay: Inmigración judía de habla húngara en Uruguay (1920-1957) [From the Edges of the Magyar World to Uruguay: Hungarian-Speaking Jewish Immigration to Uruguay (1920–1957)] (in Spanish) (1st ed.). Montevideo: Linardi & Risso. ISBN 9789974675896.
