= Polgara =

Polgara may mean:

- Polgara the Sorceress, a 1997 novel by David and Leigh Eddings, and the main character in this and other books by the same authors
- Polgara, a type of demon in the Buffy the Vampire Slayer universe

== See also ==
- Polgár (disambiguation)
- Polara (disambiguation)
