= Uruguayan Jews in Israel =

Total population
- 15,000

Regions with significant populations
- Jerusalem, Tel Aviv

Languages
- Hebrew (main language for all generations); Spanish (older generation)

Religion
- Judaism

Uruguayan Jews in Israel are Jewish immigrants and descendants of the immigrants of the Uruguayan Jewish communities, who now reside within the state of Israel.

Modern estimates put the figure of Uruguayan Jews in Israel at around 15,000.

== See also ==
- History of the Jews in Uruguay
- Aliyah from Latin America in the 2000s
- Jewish ethnic divisions
- Israel–Uruguay relations
