= Polgár =

Polgár or Polgar may refer to:

- Polgár, Hungary, a city in Hungary

== Persons with the surname ==
- Alfred Polgar (1873–1955), Austrian journalist
- Franz Polgar (1900–1979), Hungarian psychologist, hypnotist, lecturer and entertainer
- Gyula Polgár (1912–1992), Hungarian footballer
- François Polgár (born 1946), French choir conductor
- Jorge Polgar (born 1967), Uruguayan economist
- László Polgár (born 1946), Jewish Hungarian chess teacher, father of the Polgár sisters
  - The Polgár sisters, three chess players who are siblings:
    - Susan Polgar (born 1969), Hungarian-American chess player
    - Sofia Polgar (born 1974), Hungarian-Israeli chess player
    - Judit Polgár (born 1976), Hungarian chess player
- László Polgár (bass) (1947–2010), Hungarian operatic bass singer
- Peter Polgár (born 1976), Slovak footballer
- Thomas Polgar (1922–2014), Hungarian-American CIA officer
- Tibor Polgár (1907–1993), Hungarian composer

== See also ==
- Polygar, former regional administrators in southern India
  - Polygar Wars, conflicts between the Polygars and British East India Company
