= Hungary–Uruguay relations =

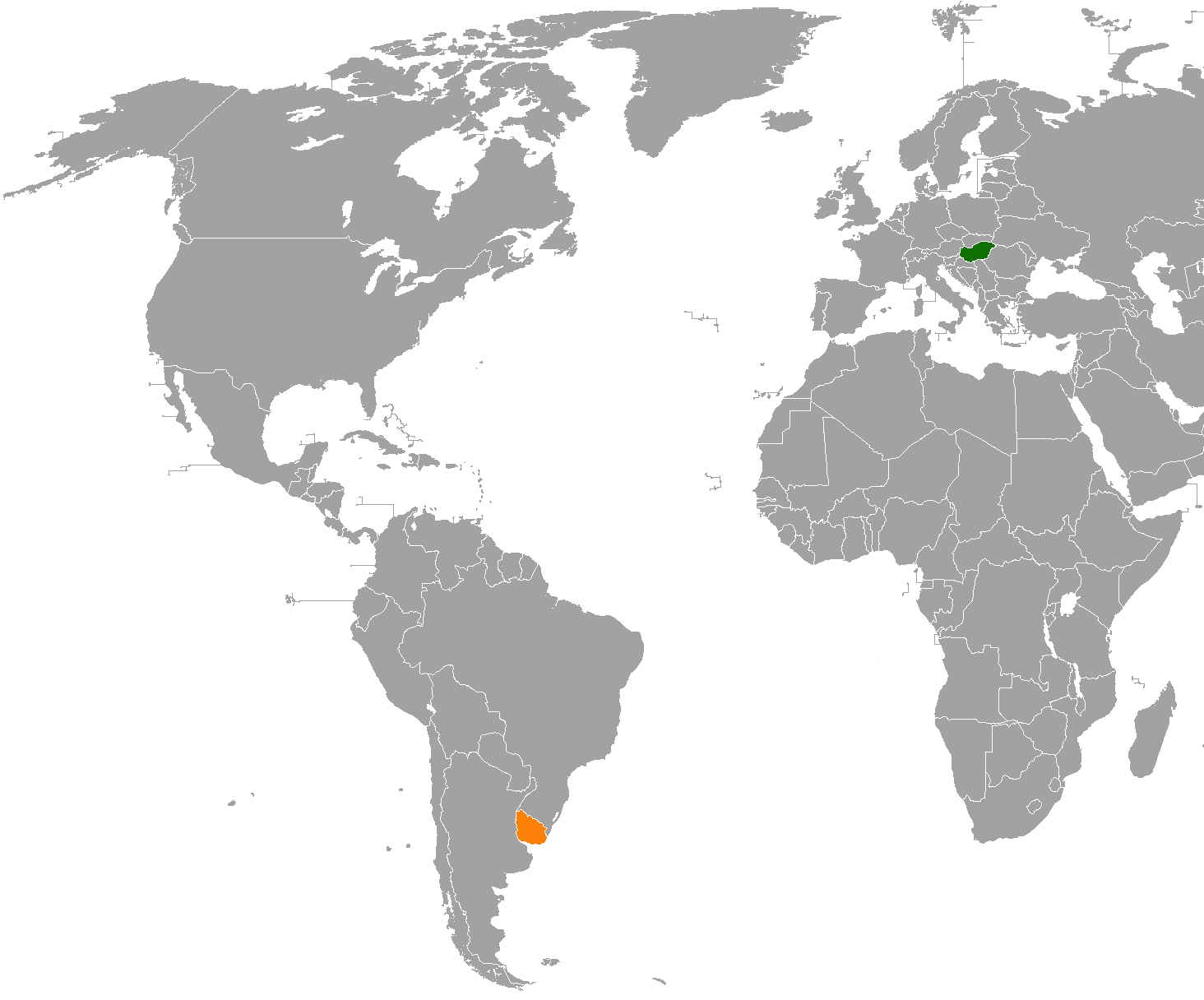

- Hungary: Uruguay

Hungary–Uruguay relations refers to the bilateral relations between Hungary and Uruguay. Hungary is represented in Uruguay by its embassy in Buenos Aires, Argentina, while Uruguay is represented in Hungary by its embassy in Vienna, Austria. Both nations are members of the United Nations.

== History ==
On 7 December 1870, the Austro–Hungarian Empire and Uruguay signed a Trade, Shipping and Friendship Treaty. In the late 1800s and early 1900s; approximately 5 to 7,000 Hungarians immigrated to Uruguay. In 1936, the Uruguayan Hungarian Association was established in Montevideo. There was also an important influx of Hungarian Jews to Uruguay during the first half of the 20th century.

In 1953, Hungary opened a trade office in Montevideo. On 14 June 1956, both nations established diplomatic relations. However, diplomatic relations could not be realized until 1964 due to the Hungarian Revolution of 1956.

Initial high-level visits between foreign ministers took place in 1972 when Hungarian Deputy Foreign Minister, Imre Hollai, paid a visit to Uruguay. In 1986, Uruguayan Foreign Minister, Enrique V. Iglesias, paid a visit to Hungary. There would be other high-level ministerial visits between both nations.

In 2002, Uruguay closed its embassy in Budapest due to budget restraints.

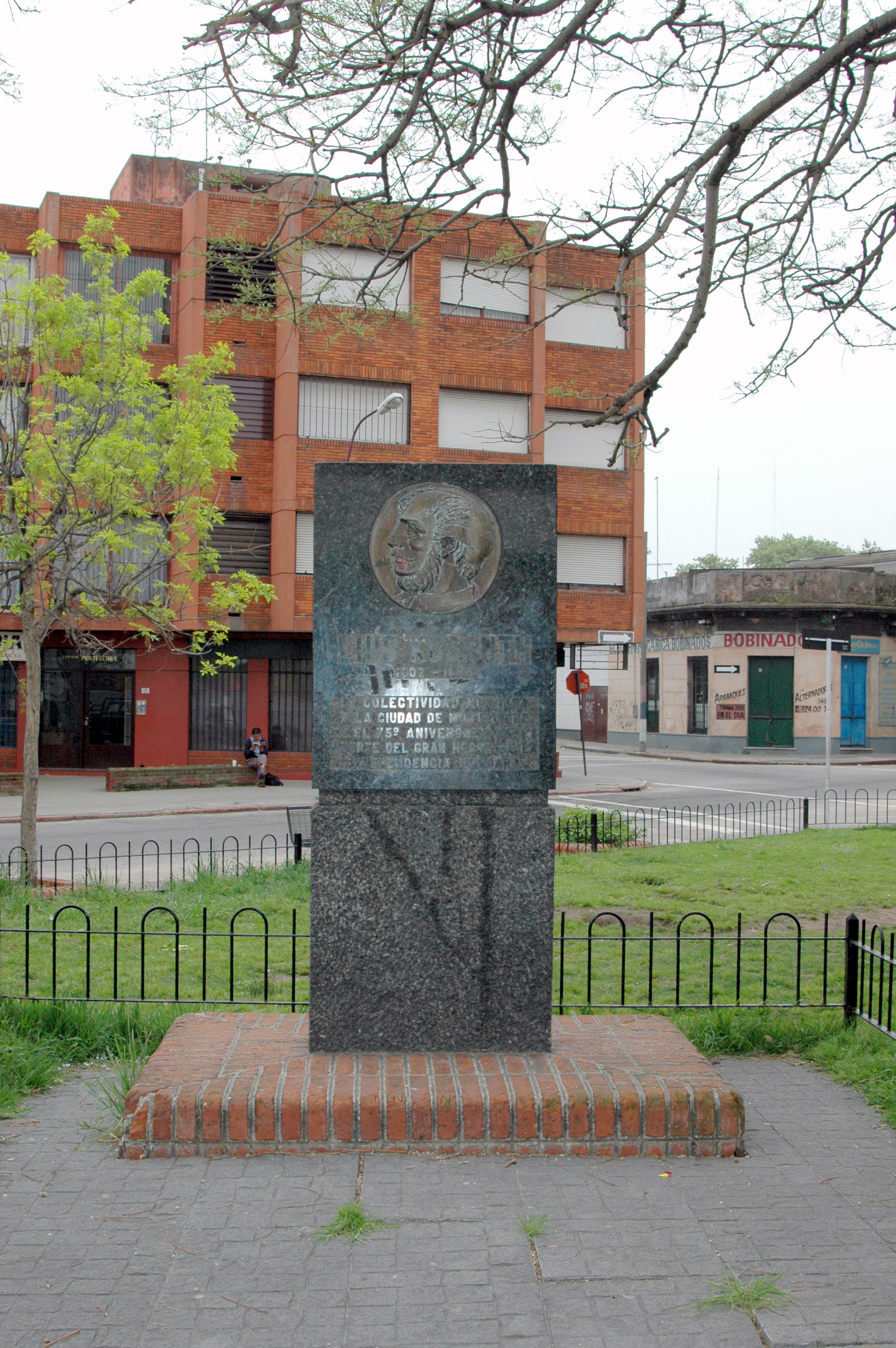
Monument to Hungarian statesman Lajos Kossuth in Montevideo.

== Bilateral agreements ==
Both nations have signed a few bilateral agreements such as an Inter-bank Agreement (1950); Agreement of reciprocal promotion and protection of investments (1992); and an Agreement to Avoid Double Taxation regarding Income Tax and Wealth Tax (1993).

== Diplomatic missions ==
- Hungary is accredited to Uruguay from its embassy in Buenos Aires, Argentina and has an embassy office in Montevideo.
- Uruguay is accredited to Hungary from its embassy in Vienna, Austria.

== See also ==
- Foreign relations of Hungary
- Foreign relations of Uruguay
- Hungarian Uruguayans
