= Itsik Vaynshenker =

Uruguayan Jewish writer (1914–1978)

- איציק װײַנשענקער
- Born: Yitskhok Vaynshenker; 1914; Terebne, Governorate of Bessarabia, Russian Empire
- Died: 1 December 1978 (aged 63–64); Montevideo, Uruguay
- Occupations: Writer, including journalist and literary critic

Itsik Vaynshenker (Yiddish: איציק װײַנשענקער; 1914–1 December 1978), born as Yitskhok Vaynshenker (Yiddish: יצחק װײַנשענקער), was a Bessarabian Jewish writer, including journalist, and literary critic. He was renowned in the Uruguayan Jewish writer circles following World War II.

== See also ==
- List of Ashkenazi Jews
- List of people from Montevideo
- List of Russian writers
- List of Uruguayan journalists
