= Holocaust Memorial, Montevideo =

Memorial to the Holocaust of the Jewish People
- Memorial del Holocausto del Pueblo Judío
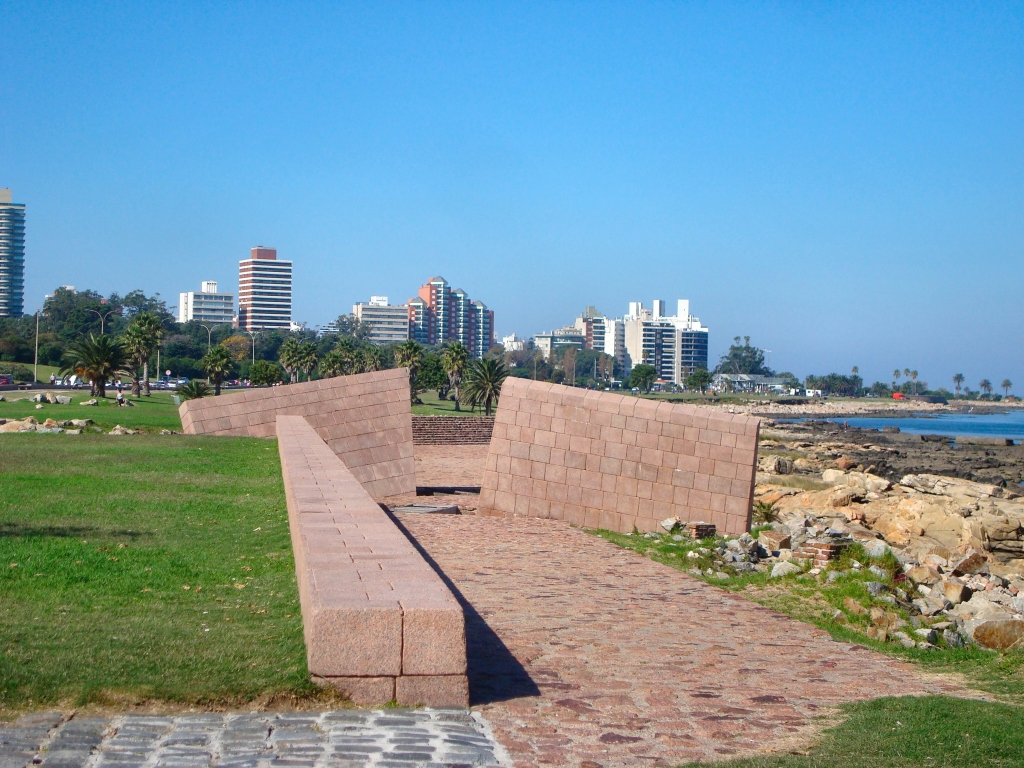
- The Holocaust Memorial in Montevideo
- Interactive map of Memorial to the Holocaust of the Jewish People
- Location: Montevideo
- Coordinates: 34°55′30.3″S 56°10′12.7″W
- Material: Pink granite
- Length: 120 metres (390 ft)
- Opening date: 1994

The Memorial to the Holocaust of the Jewish People (Spanish: Memorial del Holocausto del Pueblo Judío) is an outdoor memorial dedicated to victims of the Holocaust.

The memorial is located at the junction of Rambla Presidente Wilson and Artigas Boulevard, in the Montevidean neighbourhood of Punta Carretas, on the shores of the River Plate, in Uruguay.

The memorial is around 120 metres long, and is mostly made of pink granite, with a central window looking out at the sea. A pair of railway rails are at the approach to the memorial, and the central part of the memorial has two wooden bridge crossings. It also includes several inscribed stele, including one signed by Elie Wiesel.

It was designed by Gastón Boero, Fernando Fabiano and Sylvia Perossio, with landscaping by Carlos Pellegrino. It opened in 1994.

== Renovation ==
Following several acts of antisemitic vandalism, the memorial was renovated, and rededicated in June 2016. Apart from cleaning the memorial of antisemitic graffiti, the renovations included the addition of lights and staircases. The renovation was funded by Uruguay's Jewish umbrella organization, the Central Israelite Committee. However, a year later, the memorial was again vandalized with antisemitic slurs.

== See also ==
- List of Holocaust memorials and museums
- History of the Jews in Uruguay
