= Occupation of Hungary by Nazi Germany =

Occupation of Hungary by Nazi Germany may refer to

- German invasion of Hungary (1944) (Operation Margarethe), the occupation of Hungary by German forces on 19 March 1944
- Operation Panzerfaust, military operation to occupy Hungary in October 1944
- Government of National Unity (Hungary), puppet government formed by the Arrow Cross Party on 16 October 1944

== See also ==
- Hungary in World War II
