= Andrés Benkö =

Hungarian academic

Dr. Andrés Benkö Ph.D.
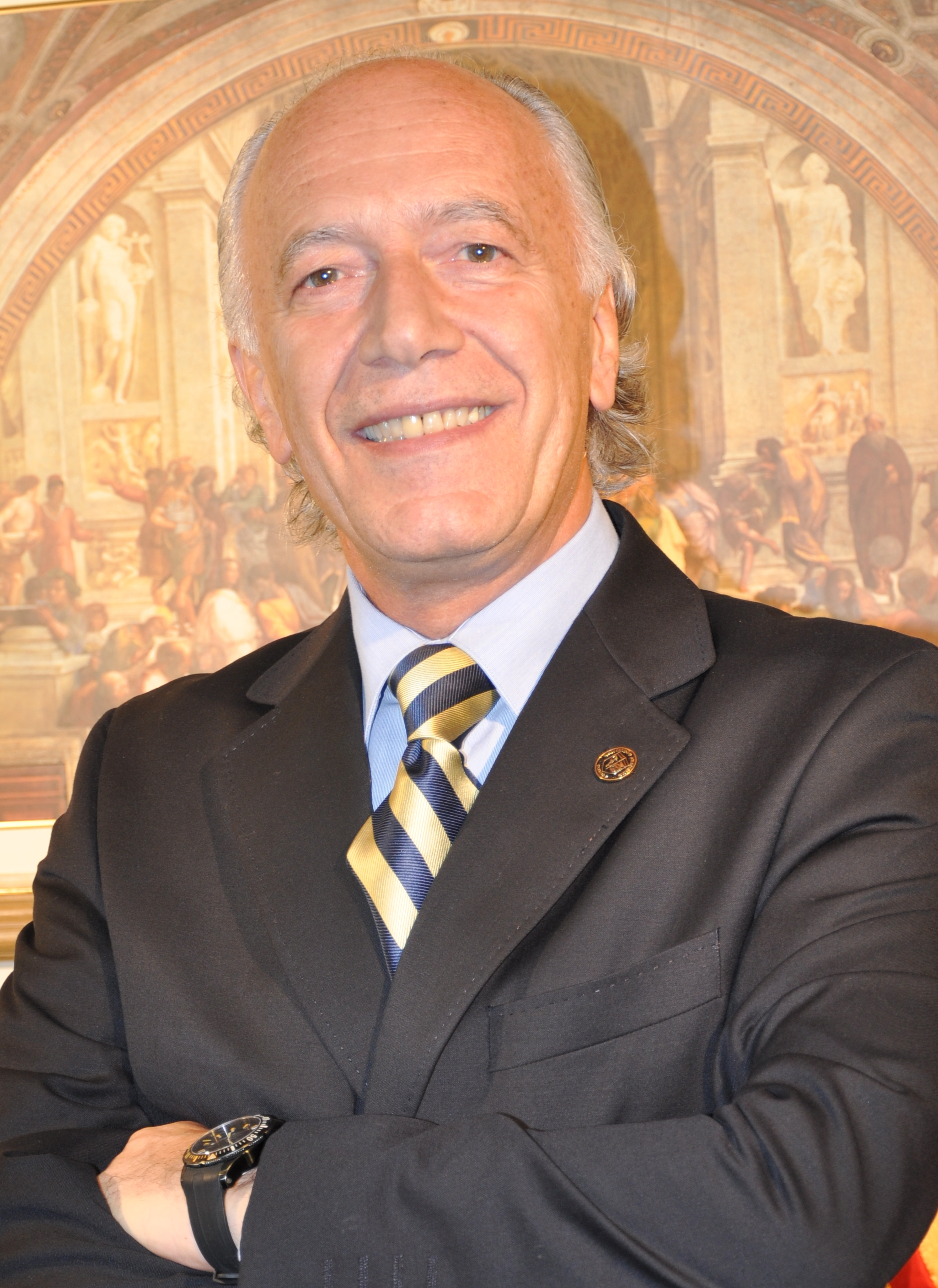
- Andrés Benkö, founder of Universidad Americana
- Born: December 2, 1943; Budapest, Hungary
- Occupations: Professor, businessman
- Website: www.andresbenko.com

Andrés José Benkö Kapuváry, born December 2, 1943) is the founder of the Universidad Americana (1994) and was president from 1994 to 2013. He previously served as the President of INCADE y Ofor Consultores (1983–1994) and as Manager of Fundación Chile (1979–1982). As the chief executive of Universidad Americana, Benkö represents the university nationally and abroad, while he continues to teach in the MBA program. From 2000 to 2004, Universidad Americana was listed among "The Best Latin American Universities" and named "The Best University in Paraguay" by the Latin American magazine América Economía.

Benkö is a prolific author and has written articles for the books MBA International Business ("Leadership and Knowledge Management") (Peru, 2004) and Consejo Latinoamericano de Escuelas de Administración ("Leadership for Professional Success") (Mexico, 2002). In collaboration with Paraguay's Ministry of Justice and National Secretary of Youth, Benkö also works to help underserved youth and prison inmates, awarding 100 scholarships to poor students with talent funded by the Office of the First Lady)

== Associations and honors ==
Benkö is the founder and former President of the Mercosur Private Universities Association. He holds the rank of "The Knightly Order of Vitez" of Hungary and the Medal of Latin American Integration (awarded by Brazil in 2002). He is a member of the Forum of Leaders of Mercosur, the Latin American Council of Business Schools (CLADEA), and AACSB International USA.

== Publications ==
Benkö has written two books. The first was Knowledge Management in Higher Education and the second was Leadership for Success with Emotional Intelligence and Social Responsibility.

== Education ==
- Universidad de Sevilla (Spain): Doctorate Degree, Economy (2004)
- Universidad Católica: Master's in Business Administration, Honorary Doctorate in Education
