= Comunidad Israelita Sefaradí =

Synagogue in Montevideo, Uruguay

Synagogue of the Sephardic Jewish Community
- Spanish: Sinagoga de la Comunidad Israelita Sefaradí
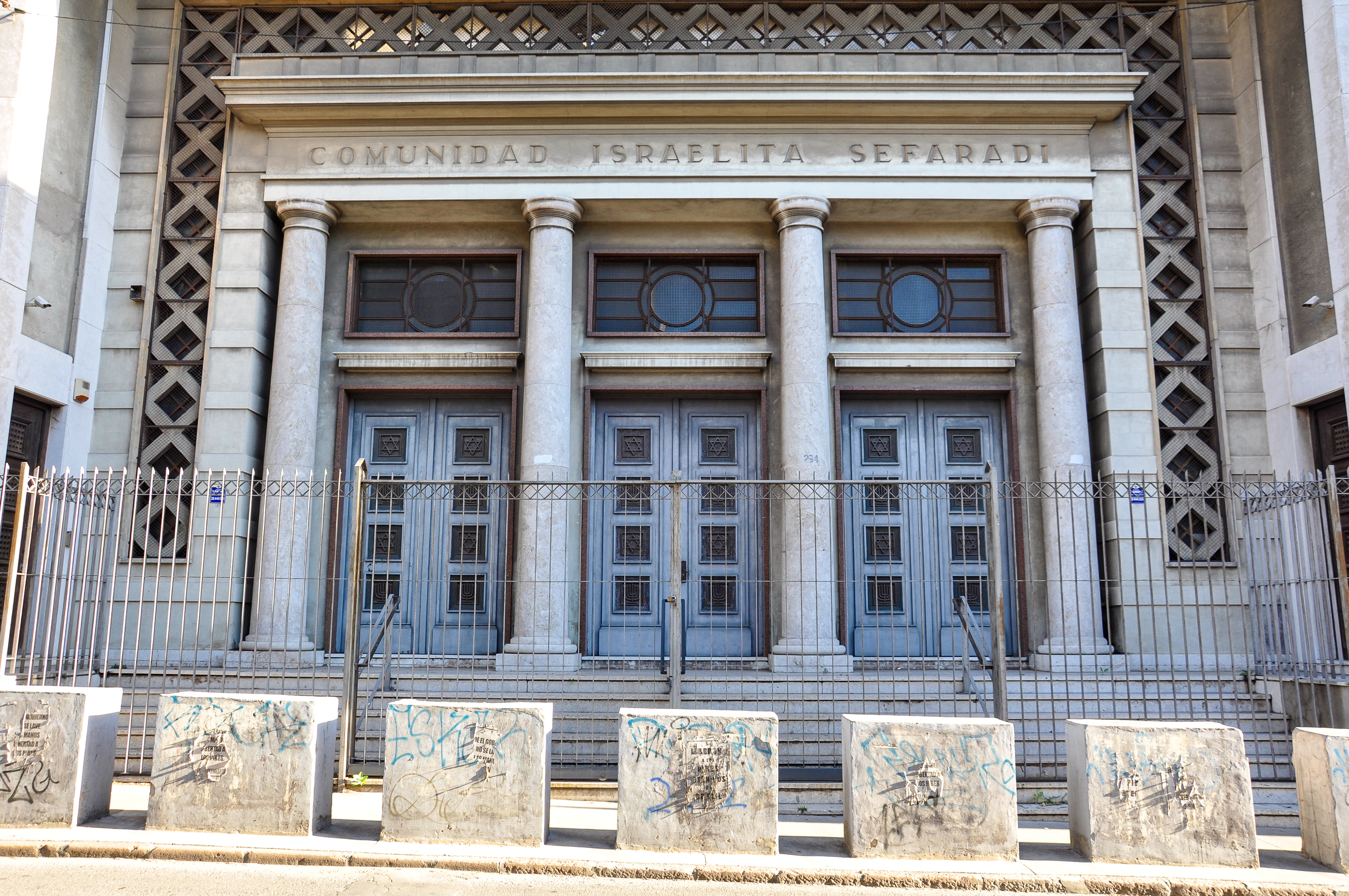
- The synagogue in 2025

- Location of the synagogue in Montevideo

Religion
- Affiliation: Judaism
- Rite: Nusach Sefard
- Ecclesiastical or organizational status: Synagogue
- Status: Active

Location
- Location: Ciudad Vieja, Montevideo
- Country: Uruguay
- Interactive map of Synagogue of the Sephardic Jewish Community
- Coordinates: 34°54′37″S 56°12′35″W

Architecture
- Completed: 1956

The Synagogue of the Sephardic Jewish Community (Spanish: Sinagoga de la Comunidad Israelita Sefaradí) is a Jewish congregation and synagogue, located in the Ciudad Vieja neighbourhood of Montevideo, Uruguay.

== Overview ==
The Sephardic Community has been present in Montevideo since the first decades of the 20th century. This temple opened its doors in 1956 with the name Beth Israel; it was inspired by the Portuguese Synagogue of New York.

== See also ==
- History of the Jews in Uruguay
- List of synagogues in Uruguay
