= Carlos A. Végh =

Uruguayan academic economist (born 1958)

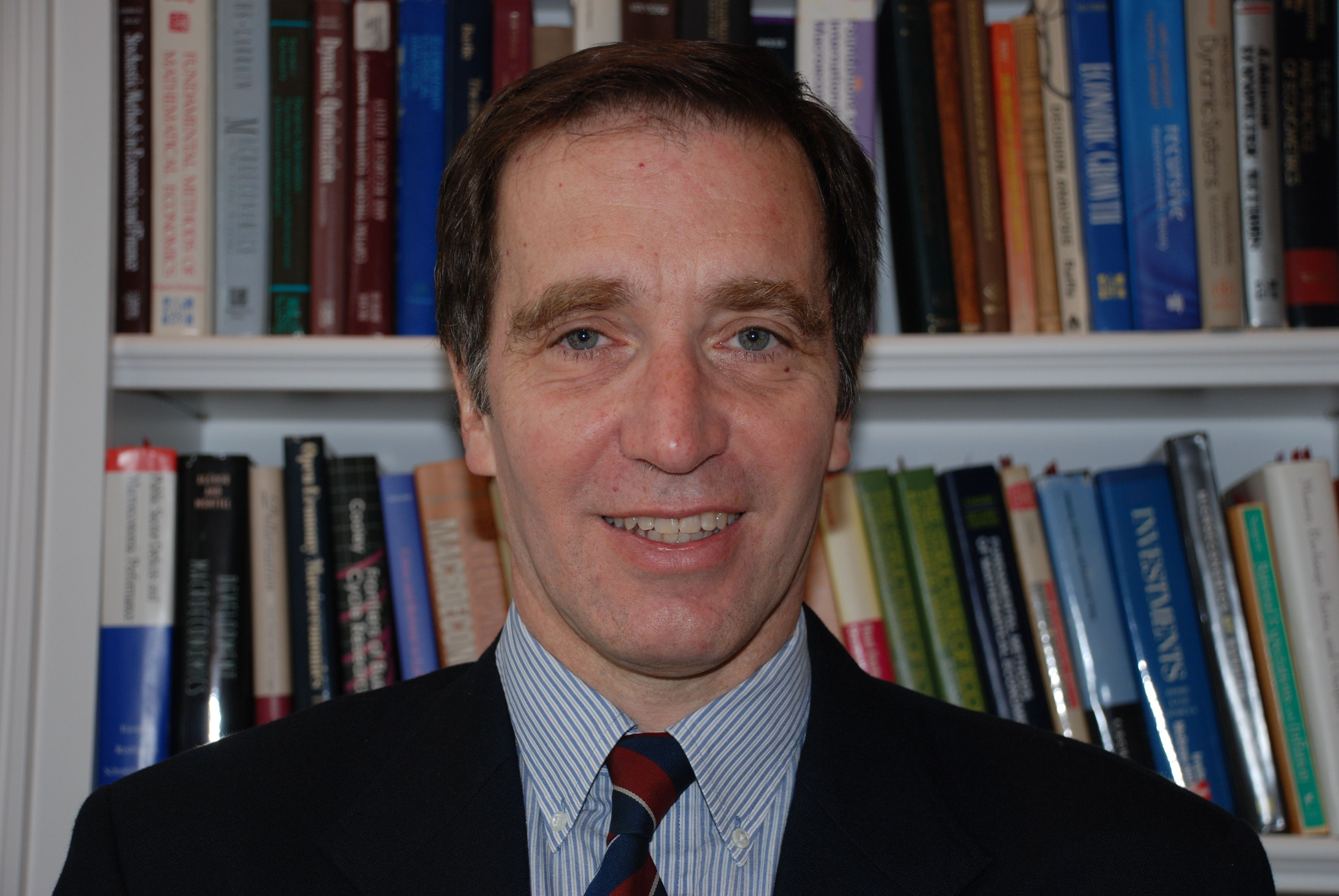
- Végh in 2010
- Born: August 1, 1958 (age 68); Montevideo, Uruguay

Academic background
- Education: University of Chicago
- Influences: Guillermo Calvo · Robert E. Lucas · Jacob Frenkel · Rudi Dornbusch

Academic work
- Discipline: International economics
- Institutions: World Bank Johns Hopkins School of Advanced International Studies (SAIS)
- Website: Information at IDEAS / RePEc

Carlos A. Végh (born August 1, 1958) is a Uruguayan academic economist. Since 2013, he is the Fred H. Sanderson Professor of International Economics at the Johns Hopkins School of Advanced International Studies (SAIS), and holds a joint appointment with Johns Hopkins' Department of Economics. He is also a research associate at the National Bureau of Economic Research since 1998. He was the World Bank's chief economist for Latin America and the Caribbean from February 1, 2017 to June 30, 2019, while on leave from Johns Hopkins. He was previously a professor of economics and vice-chair of undergraduate studies at UCLA (1996-2005) and professor of economics at the University of Maryland (2005–2013). His research work on monetary and fiscal policy in emerging and developing countries has been highly influential in both academic and policy circles. In particular, his work on fiscal procyclicality in emerging markets has been instrumental in generating a copious literature on the subject, which has influenced the adoption of fiscal rules in many emerging markets.

== Early life and career ==
Végh was born in Montevideo, Uruguay, on August 1, 1958, the son of a prominent Uruguayan economist, Alejandro Végh Villegas, who served as Economy Minister of Uruguay from 1974 to 1976 and again from 1982 to 1983. He is also the grandson of Carlos R. Végh Garzón, who was Economy Minister in 1967.

Between 1979 and 1982, Végh studied economics as an undergraduate at the University of the Republic (Uruguay), before transferring to American University, where he received a B.A. in economics in 1983. He started his Ph.D. in economics at the University of Chicago in 1983 and graduated in 1987, working under the supervision of Joshua Aizenman and Jacob Frenkel. While at Chicago, he was the H.B. Earhart Fellow (1984–1986), sponsored by Prof. Robert E. Lucas Jr. After graduating, he joined the International Monetary Fund's research department. In 1995, he left the IMF and was a visiting associate professor at the University of Chicago. He became a (tenured) associate professor at UCLA's economics department in 1996. He was professor of economics at UCLA from 1998 to 2007 and Vice-Chair for Undergraduate Studies in 2004–2005. During 1997–2003, he was the chair of the program in comparative and topical studies at UCLA's Latin American Center. In 2005, he became professor of economics at the University of Maryland. In 2013, he moved to Johns Hopkins University with an endowed chair, where he is jointly appointed in SAIS and the economics department. He was appointed the World Bank's chief economist for Latin America and the Caribbean in February 2017.

Végh has been co-editor of both the Journal of Development Economics (2000–2003) and the Journal of International Economics (1999–2003). He has also been on the editorial board of the International Tax and Public Finance and the Latin American Economic Review, among others, and currently serves on the editorial board of the IMF Economic Review and is the Chief Editor of Economia (the Journal of the Latin American and Caribbean Economic Association. He was an elected member of LACEA's Executive Committee (1998–2000) and served as Treasurer from 2002 to 2004. He won the Warren C. Scoville Distinguished Teaching Award for excellence in undergraduate teaching while at UCLA in 2001 and has won several awards for graduate teaching at the University of Maryland. He was Senior Resident Scholar at the IMF's Research Department (2003–2004) and has also been a visiting scholar at the IMF's Office of the First Deputy Managing Director, the Inter-American Development Bank's Research Department, the World Bank's research department (Dec), the Banco de la Republica (Central Bank of Colombia), and Banco de Mexico (Central Bank of Mexico). He has also been a visiting professor at the University of the Pacific (Peru) and Universidad del CEMA (Argentina). He is also a contributor to VoxEU.

== Research and publication ==
Végh's main areas of expertise are monetary and fiscal policy in emerging and developing countries. His most influential work has been on inflation stabilization in high inflation countries, inflation and growth in transition economies, interest rate policy in developing countries, optimal exchange rate regimes, cyclical properties of fiscal policy in developing countries, and fiscal multipliers. His work has been published in leading international scholarly journals such as the Journal of Political Economy, the American Economic Review, the Review of Economic Studies, the Journal of Monetary Economics, the Journal of International Economics, the Journal of Development Economics, the Journal of Money, Credit, and Banking, the Journal of Economic Literature, the Journal of Economic Perspectives, and the National Bureau of Economic Research's Macroeconomics Annual, among others. He contributed (jointly with Guillermo Calvo) with a chapter on inflation stabilization and BOP crisis to the Handbook of Monetary Economics (edited by John Taylor and Michael Woodford). He is also the co-editor of Money, Crisis, and Transition: Essays in Honor of Guillermo Calvo (published by MIT Press) and is the author of a graduate textbook on open economic macroeconomics, published by MIT Press). Végh has close to 15,000 citations in Google Scholar, with 3 papers (all related to fiscal procycliclity) having more than 1,000 Google Scholar citations. He is also among the top 5 percent of research economists worldwide according to 31 different criteria used by IDEAS.

His work and views are regularly featured in the international press, including The New York Times,The Economist, Financial Times,The Wall Street Journal, "The International Banker", La Nación (Argentina), The National Review, El Colombiano (Colombia), La Tercera (Chile), Asia Times, and Reuters, among others. Végh's work on high inflation has been cited in speeches by Ben Bernanke and Charles L. Evans (President of the Federal Reserve of Chicago). The former Chancellor of the Exchequer, George Osborne, referred to Végh's work on fiscal multipliers in a campaign speech in September 2009.
