= Nueva Congregación Israelita =

Conservative synagogue in Montevideo, Uruguay

Synagogue of the New Jewish Congregation
- Spanish: Sinagoga de la Nueva Congregación Israelita
- Location of the synagogue in Montevideo

Religion
- Affiliation: Conservative Judaism
- Ecclesiastical or organizational status: Synagogue
- Leadership: Rabbi Daniel Dolinsky
- Status: Active

Location
- Location: Cipriano Payán Street, Pocitos, Montevideo
- Country: Uruguay
- Interactive map of Synagogue of the New Jewish Congregation
- Coordinates: 34°54′20″S 56°08′57″W

Architecture
- Established: 1936 (as a congregation)

Website
- nci.org.uy

The Synagogue of the New Jewish Congregation (Spanish: Sinagoga de la Nueva Congregación Israelita; abbreviated as its acronym NCI), is a Conservative Jewish congregation and synagogue, located on Cipriano Payán Street, in the Pocitos neighbourhood of Montevideo, Uruguay.

== Overview ==
The New Jewish Congregation was founded in 1936 mostly by German and Austrian Jews who fled Nazism. It established two synagogues in Centro; the big one on Wilson Ferreira Aldunate Street is Conservative, and the smaller one was Orthodox.

In the 21st century, a new Temple was established in the neighbourhood of Pocitos, at Cipriano Payán street.

== See also ==
- History of the Jews in Uruguay
- List of synagogues in Uruguay
