= Central Israelite Committee of Uruguay =

- Comité Central Israelita del Uruguay
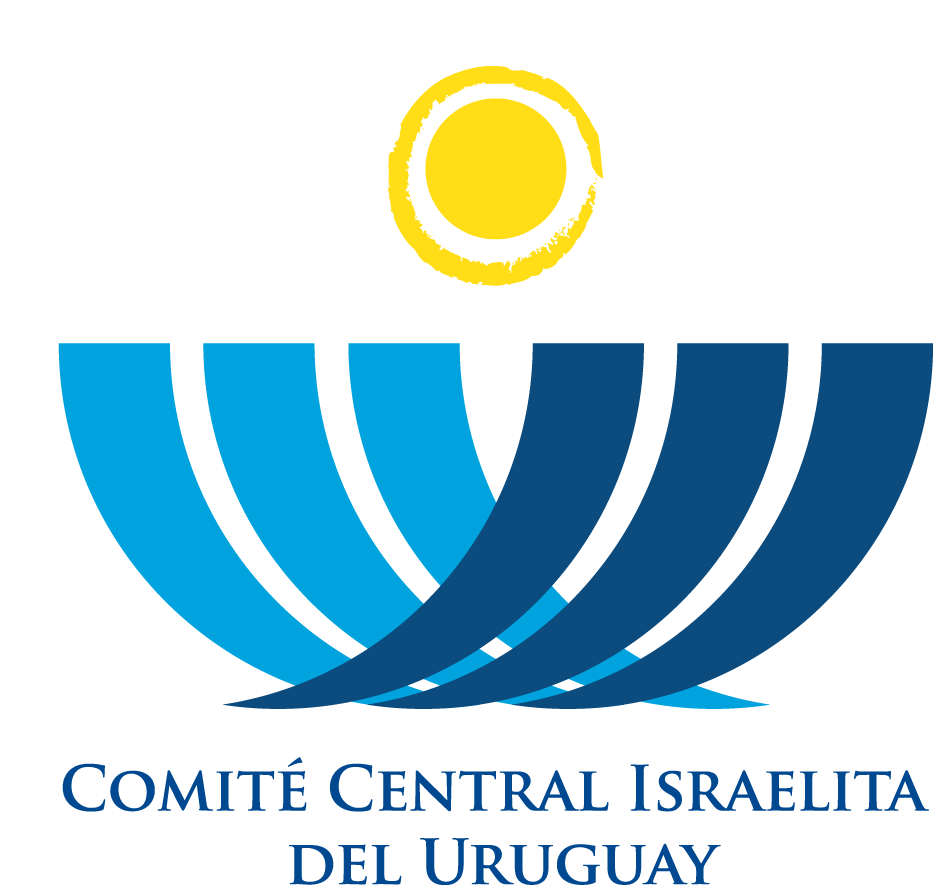
- Abbreviation: CCIU
- Formation: December 1940, 11; 85 years ago
- Headquarters: 623 Camacuá St., Montevideo
- Region served: Uruguay
- President: Claudio Elkan
- Website: cciu.org.uy

The Comité Central Israelita del Uruguay (Spanish for 'Central Israelite Committee of Uruguay') is the umbrella and central organization of Uruguay's Jewish community. Established in 1940 it gathers 29 Jewish Zionist institutions, serving as the community's political representative in official events and conducts all contact with authorities.

The presidency of the committee rotates among the four most important communities and serves for a period of two years. The current president since 2026 is Claudio Elkan. It is affiliated to the World Jewish Congress and the Latin American Jewish Congress.

== History ==
The Jewish presence in Uruguay dates back to the 16th century, with the settlement of conversos. However, significant Jewish immigration began at the end of the 19th century with the arrival of Sephardic Jews from Argentina and Brazil.

In the first decades of the 20th century, Ashkenazi Jews from Eastern Europe began to arrive in Uruguay to escape pogroms and poverty. A large part of them settled in the Villa Muñoz neighborhood of Montevideo, where synagogues and schools were established, turning the area into the nucleus of the Uruguayan Jewish community.

Due to the differences in origin and language, the Jews in Uruguay merged into different communities: the Israelite Community (Kehilá), the Hungarian Israelite Community and the Sephardic Israelite Community, all three founded in 1932, and the Nueva Congregación Israelita, founded in 1936.

Due to the rise of Nazism in Europe, Uruguayan Jews grouped together to create an organization that would bring together and politically represent the entire community. On December 11, 1940, with the union of all the Jewish communities that had existed since previous years, the Central Israelite Committee of Uruguay was created.
