= Carlos Végh Garzón =

Uruguayan politician (1902–1984)

Carlos Vegh Garzón (Montevideo, 1902–1984) was a Uruguayan politician.

== Background ==
He was a prominent member of the Uruguayan Colorado Party.

== Public offices ==
He served as Minister of Economy and Finance in 1967, under President Oscar Gestido. A year later, he was President of the Banco de la República Oriental del Uruguay.

== Personal ==
Son of Alejandro Végh and Sofia Garzon. His grandfather Sándor Végh was a Hungarian military officer who migrated to Uruguay in the mid-19th century.

Married to Sofia Villegas Suárez (a great-granddaughter of President Joaquín Suárez). Had six children, including Alejandro Vegh Villegas, who was Minister of the Economy in 1974-1976 and again in 1982–1983. His grandson, Carlos A. Vegh, is an academic economist.

== See also ==
- Politics of Uruguay
- List of political families § Uruguay
