= Alejandro Stock =

Uruguayan-Spanish artist

Alejandro Stock Silberman
- Born: 1965 (age 60–61); Montevideo, Uruguay
- Known for: Painting Sculpture Cinema
- Relatives: Lidia Silberman (mother)

Alejandro Stock Silberman is a Uruguayan-Spanish artist. Stock Silberman was born in Montevideo, Uruguay in 1965, of Jewish-Russian origin through his mother Lidia Silberman and of Jewish-Austrian origin on his father's side. Since 1993 he has lived and worked in Madrid, Spain. From an early age, he felt an artistic calling, entering his first workshop at the age of 5. Since then, he has completed numerous artistic and painting studies with master Nelson Ramos at the Centro de Estudios Artísticos, as well as participating in various courses, fellowships, and workshops in Uruguay, the USA, and Spain. Currently, he works both as a doctor and as an artist.

== Exhibitions ==
Since 1985 he has participated in more than 150 exhibits in Uruguay, Spain, Germany, Chile, the United States, Hungary, China, et cetera. In 2007 he was invited to participate as an Honorary Artist in the 16th Salón Nacional Renault de Paris, participating as part of the jury as well.

== Prizes and distinctions ==
He has received distinctions on more than 30 occasions in painting, sculpture, cinema and literature, including working as a fellow at a Complutense University of Madrid summer workshop dedicated to perfecting engraving technique under the guidance of master artist José Hernández.

His works can be found in both private and public collections in Spain, Uruguay, the United States, Israel, France, Chile, England, China, and elsewhere.

== Medical and Professional Career ==
Stock Silberman holds a Doctor of Medicine degree from the University of the Republic (Uruguay, 1993), which was homologated in Spain by the Ministry of Health in 1995. He is also a Clinical Specialist in Psychoanalytic Psychotherapy from the Pontifical University of Comillas (Spain, 2012). His professional practice in medicine and psychoanalysis runs parallel to his artistic career.

== See also ==
- alejandrostock.com
