= Benkow =

Benkow is a Norwegian surname. Notable people with the surname include:

- Bjørn Benkow (1940–2010), Norwegian journalist
- Jo Benkow (1924–2013), Norwegian politician and writer
