= Alejandro Végh Villegas =

Uruguayan politician (1928–2017)

Minister of Economy and Finance of Uruguay
- In office December 12, 1983 – March 1, 1985
- President: Gregorio Alvarez
- Preceded by: Walter Lusiardo Aznárez
- Succeeded by: Ricardo Zerbino

Minister of Economy and Finance of Uruguay
- In office July 12, 1974 – September 1, 1976
- President: Juan María Bordaberry
- Preceded by: Moisés Cohen
- Succeeded by: Valentín Arismendi

Personal details
- Born: October 17, 1928 Brussels, Belgium
- Died: March 13, 2017 (aged 88)
- Party: Colorado
- Spouse: Suzanne Gramont
- Children: Carlos A. Vegh
- Parent(s): Carlos Végh Garzón; Sofía Villegas Suárez
- Education: University of the Republic; Harvard University
- Profession: Engineer, Economist

Alejandro Végh Villegas (17 October 1928 – 13 March 2017) was a Uruguayan politician, engineer, and economist.

== Background ==
Villegas was born in Brussels. His great-grandfather Sándor Végh was a Hungarian military officer who migrated to Uruguay in the mid-19th century. And his mother was a great-grandchild of President Joaquín Suárez.

He has been a prominent business leader in Uruguay. His father, Carlos Végh Garzón, was Economy Minister in 1967.

== Public offices ==
He served as Minister of Economy and Finance of Uruguay from 1974 to 1976 and again from 1983 to 1985.

In between these periods of office, he also served as Uruguayan Ambassador to the United States from 1982 to 1983.

== Personal life ==
He was married to Suzanne Gramont in 1954. His only son, Carlos A. Vegh, was born in 1958, and is an academic economist.

== See also ==
- Politics of Uruguay
- List of political families#Uruguay
