= Fundación Chile =

Fundación Chile (FCh) is a non profit corporation created in 1976 through a joint agreement between the Chilean government and ITT Corporation. It is essentially a technological do tank that has worked successfully to foster Chilean business and industry growth through technological innovation and implementation.

== Projects ==
- Fundacion Chile's most notable success has been in the salmon farming industry. FCh is widely credited with turning Chile (a country with no native salmon population) into the world's second largest salmon producer. They have done this through a number of different business ventures.
- FCh has worked with the public Chilean school system to create EducarChile, an internet portal which has become a pillar of the national school system and the 7th most visited site in Chile.
- FCh has worked with the competences of employment of people to create an internet portal which has become the first observatory of labor market movements in Chile. They also have a special program to train people in employment skills with a constructivist methodology.
