= Jorge Polgar =

Uruguayan economist

Jorge Polgar (born 14 September 1967 in Montevideo) is a Uruguayan economist.

Graduated at the University of the Republic, Polgar holds a PhD from Georgetown University.

Since 2016 he is the chairman of the state-owned Banco de la República Oriental del Uruguay.
