= Suzie Navot =

Israeli legal scholar

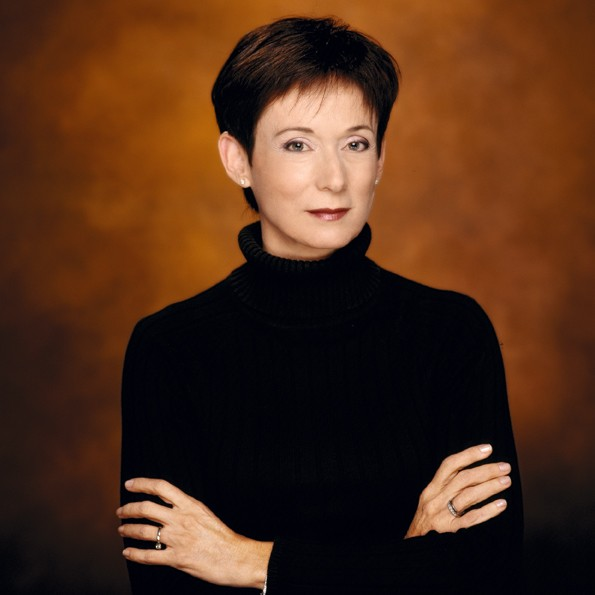
Suzie Navot

Suzie Navot (Hebrew: סוזי נבות) is an Israeli full professor of constitutional law. She is the Vice President of Research at the Israel Democracy Institute. Prior to her appointment at the I.D.I, she was a member of faculty at the Striks Faculty of Law at the College of Management Academic Studies.

== Personal life ==
Suzie Navot was born in Montevideo, Uruguay, and made aliyah to Israel with her family in 1970. She served in the army at the IDF Spokesperson's Unit foreign liaison office. She studied French language and literature, and later, law, at Tel Aviv University, where she earned an LL.B. cum laude. She also received an M.A. cum laude in public policy from Tel Aviv University in 1990 and an LL.D. from the Hebrew University of Jerusalem in 1998. Her doctoral thesis, under the supervision of Prof. Claude Klein, deals with parliamentary immunity. She is married to Yoram Navot, a personal-injuries lawyer, and they have three daughters.

== Legal and academic career ==
Navot taught constitutional law and other courses in public law at the Faculty of Law at the College of Management . She served in several academic committees at the law school, and served as head of the public law division and head of the teaching committee president of the disciplinary courts at the college.

Navot was a visiting professor at various universities and was a visiting professor for several years at the University of Paris I (Sorbonne). From 2009 to 2019 she served as a visiting professor at Israel's National Security College where she taught Constitutional Law to high rank army officers. She teaches also high rank police officers at the Police Academy and at other security institutions. Navot gives regularly selected lectures for public institutions such as Judges, lawyers, and government senior clerks, as well as to different foreign delegations visiting Israel.

She was the Chairperson of the Israeli Association of Public Law and is a member of the Israel Bar Association. Navot is also a member of the executive council of the Israeli Association of Legislation, and a member of the Executive Council of the International Association of Constitutional Law (IACL)

== Scholarships, Awards and Prizes ==
1993- 2022 - (every year for almost 30 consecutive years) Navot was awarded the "Teaching excellence nomination" and the Dean/ President award for excellence in teaching at the Striks Faculty of Law. 2020 - The "Movement for Quality Government in Israel" special award. 2019 - The "Inspirer lecturer" award by the National Students Union. 2017 - The Zeltner Prize for special contribution to the Israeli society in the field of Law, through research, teaching, public involvement and appearance in international stages for the development and improvement of constitutional law. 2010 - The "Ometz" Award for Special public involvement on the fight against corruption and for the raising of public awareness on proper government.

== Public activities and professional counseling ==
Navot was member of several public committees, such as the committee appointed to prepare an ethical code for the Israeli parliament and the committee appointed by the Israeli president for the presidential volunteers' award; the Public Committee appointed by the Israeli President for the Presidential award (among others, U.S. President Barack Obama, former U.S. President Bill Clinton and Former Secretary of State Henry Kissinger were elected for the presidential award). Navot was a member of a Committee at the Council for Higher Education in Israel, and a member of the board of directors for the Civil Service education program in Israel. She was a member of the Beinish Public Committee for the preparation of a new law on the election's propaganda (appointed by the Israeli President and the Chair of the Central Elections Committee); and currently (2021) is a Member of the Committee presided by the Minister of Justice for the preparation of a draft for the Basic Law: the Legislature (appointed by the Labor Party).

Navot has prepared many written opinions for the Knesset Committees and other government institutions, and among others on the Referendum Law, the legal aspects of the oath of allegiance by Knesset Members, reform on the electoral system and parliamentary immunities. She has served as a consultant to different branches of government, public institutions as well as private lawyers, in constitutional questions.

She is well known as a senior commentator for the Israeli media on constitutional and political legal issues and publishes regularly in the Israeli newspapers and electronic media. She has been cited in the international media for commentary on Israeli constitutional and parliamentary legal issues.

Navot speaks English, Hebrew, Spanish and French and Italian. She participates frequently in conferences and seminars in Europe, and has lectured in international seminars at the French National Assembly, at the Belgium Senate, at the Italian Parliament and at the Constitutional Court in Rome.

== Publications ==
Navot is the author of The Constitutional Law of Israel (Kluwer 2007) and The Constitution of Israel: A Contextual Analysis (Hart 2014). She has also authored chapters in several books as well as dozens of legal articles, in different languages.
